

571001–571100 

|-bgcolor=#d6d6d6
| 571001 ||  || — || December 27, 2006 || Mount Lemmon || Mount Lemmon Survey || URS || align=right | 2.9 km || 
|-id=002 bgcolor=#d6d6d6
| 571002 ||  || — || December 27, 2006 || Mount Lemmon || Mount Lemmon Survey ||  || align=right | 2.3 km || 
|-id=003 bgcolor=#d6d6d6
| 571003 ||  || — || October 29, 2005 || Kitt Peak || Spacewatch ||  || align=right | 2.6 km || 
|-id=004 bgcolor=#fefefe
| 571004 ||  || — || November 22, 2006 || Kitt Peak || Spacewatch ||  || align=right data-sort-value="0.75" | 750 m || 
|-id=005 bgcolor=#d6d6d6
| 571005 ||  || — || December 15, 2006 || Mount Lemmon || Mount Lemmon Survey ||  || align=right | 4.1 km || 
|-id=006 bgcolor=#d6d6d6
| 571006 ||  || — || December 14, 2012 || ESA OGS || ESA OGS ||  || align=right | 3.1 km || 
|-id=007 bgcolor=#d6d6d6
| 571007 ||  || — || November 25, 2006 || Mount Lemmon || Mount Lemmon Survey ||  || align=right | 2.5 km || 
|-id=008 bgcolor=#d6d6d6
| 571008 ||  || — || February 9, 2008 || Kitt Peak || Spacewatch ||  || align=right | 2.4 km || 
|-id=009 bgcolor=#d6d6d6
| 571009 ||  || — || October 24, 2011 || Haleakala || Pan-STARRS ||  || align=right | 2.8 km || 
|-id=010 bgcolor=#E9E9E9
| 571010 ||  || — || May 9, 2003 || Anderson Mesa || LONEOS ||  || align=right | 1.5 km || 
|-id=011 bgcolor=#fefefe
| 571011 ||  || — || May 8, 2008 || Kitt Peak || Spacewatch ||  || align=right data-sort-value="0.75" | 750 m || 
|-id=012 bgcolor=#d6d6d6
| 571012 ||  || — || December 23, 2012 || Haleakala || Pan-STARRS ||  || align=right | 2.9 km || 
|-id=013 bgcolor=#d6d6d6
| 571013 ||  || — || December 11, 2012 || Mount Lemmon || Mount Lemmon Survey ||  || align=right | 2.3 km || 
|-id=014 bgcolor=#d6d6d6
| 571014 ||  || — || October 26, 2011 || Haleakala || Pan-STARRS ||  || align=right | 2.6 km || 
|-id=015 bgcolor=#E9E9E9
| 571015 ||  || — || December 24, 2006 || Kitt Peak || Spacewatch ||  || align=right | 1.1 km || 
|-id=016 bgcolor=#fefefe
| 571016 ||  || — || December 21, 2006 || Kitt Peak || L. H. Wasserman ||  || align=right data-sort-value="0.58" | 580 m || 
|-id=017 bgcolor=#E9E9E9
| 571017 ||  || — || November 5, 2010 || Kitt Peak || Spacewatch ||  || align=right data-sort-value="0.85" | 850 m || 
|-id=018 bgcolor=#E9E9E9
| 571018 ||  || — || December 24, 2006 || Kitt Peak || Spacewatch ||  || align=right | 1.3 km || 
|-id=019 bgcolor=#E9E9E9
| 571019 ||  || — || December 26, 2006 || Kitt Peak || Spacewatch ||  || align=right data-sort-value="0.83" | 830 m || 
|-id=020 bgcolor=#E9E9E9
| 571020 ||  || — || January 14, 2011 || Kitt Peak || Spacewatch ||  || align=right data-sort-value="0.99" | 990 m || 
|-id=021 bgcolor=#d6d6d6
| 571021 ||  || — || December 23, 2012 || Haleakala || Pan-STARRS || Tj (2.99) || align=right | 2.7 km || 
|-id=022 bgcolor=#d6d6d6
| 571022 ||  || — || February 18, 2013 || Mount Lemmon || Mount Lemmon Survey ||  || align=right | 2.8 km || 
|-id=023 bgcolor=#d6d6d6
| 571023 ||  || — || November 18, 2011 || Mount Lemmon || Mount Lemmon Survey ||  || align=right | 2.8 km || 
|-id=024 bgcolor=#d6d6d6
| 571024 ||  || — || December 27, 2006 || Kitt Peak || Spacewatch ||  || align=right | 2.1 km || 
|-id=025 bgcolor=#d6d6d6
| 571025 ||  || — || November 3, 2011 || Mount Lemmon || Mount Lemmon Survey ||  || align=right | 2.8 km || 
|-id=026 bgcolor=#d6d6d6
| 571026 ||  || — || September 24, 2011 || Haleakala || Pan-STARRS ||  || align=right | 2.1 km || 
|-id=027 bgcolor=#d6d6d6
| 571027 ||  || — || December 21, 2006 || Kitt Peak || Spacewatch ||  || align=right | 2.9 km || 
|-id=028 bgcolor=#d6d6d6
| 571028 ||  || — || February 13, 2008 || Mount Lemmon || Mount Lemmon Survey ||  || align=right | 2.4 km || 
|-id=029 bgcolor=#d6d6d6
| 571029 ||  || — || January 20, 2013 || Mount Lemmon || Mount Lemmon Survey ||  || align=right | 2.3 km || 
|-id=030 bgcolor=#E9E9E9
| 571030 ||  || — || June 5, 2016 || Haleakala || Pan-STARRS ||  || align=right data-sort-value="0.97" | 970 m || 
|-id=031 bgcolor=#d6d6d6
| 571031 ||  || — || December 27, 2006 || Mount Lemmon || Mount Lemmon Survey ||  || align=right | 3.0 km || 
|-id=032 bgcolor=#d6d6d6
| 571032 ||  || — || December 27, 2006 || Mount Lemmon || Mount Lemmon Survey ||  || align=right | 2.6 km || 
|-id=033 bgcolor=#d6d6d6
| 571033 ||  || — || December 26, 2006 || Kitt Peak || Spacewatch ||  || align=right | 2.0 km || 
|-id=034 bgcolor=#d6d6d6
| 571034 ||  || — || December 24, 2006 || Kitt Peak || Spacewatch ||  || align=right | 2.7 km || 
|-id=035 bgcolor=#d6d6d6
| 571035 ||  || — || December 27, 2006 || Mount Lemmon || Mount Lemmon Survey ||  || align=right | 3.2 km || 
|-id=036 bgcolor=#E9E9E9
| 571036 ||  || — || January 11, 2007 || Calar Alto || J. L. Ortiz, P. Santos-Sanz ||  || align=right data-sort-value="0.75" | 750 m || 
|-id=037 bgcolor=#d6d6d6
| 571037 ||  || — || December 24, 2006 || Kitt Peak || Spacewatch ||  || align=right | 3.4 km || 
|-id=038 bgcolor=#E9E9E9
| 571038 ||  || — || January 15, 2007 || Catalina || CSS ||  || align=right | 1.1 km || 
|-id=039 bgcolor=#d6d6d6
| 571039 ||  || — || October 30, 2005 || Mount Lemmon || Mount Lemmon Survey ||  || align=right | 2.3 km || 
|-id=040 bgcolor=#d6d6d6
| 571040 ||  || — || January 8, 2007 || Mount Lemmon || Mount Lemmon Survey ||  || align=right | 2.2 km || 
|-id=041 bgcolor=#E9E9E9
| 571041 ||  || — || January 10, 2007 || Mount Lemmon || Mount Lemmon Survey ||  || align=right data-sort-value="0.99" | 990 m || 
|-id=042 bgcolor=#fefefe
| 571042 ||  || — || December 27, 2006 || Mount Lemmon || Mount Lemmon Survey ||  || align=right data-sort-value="0.79" | 790 m || 
|-id=043 bgcolor=#d6d6d6
| 571043 ||  || — || January 10, 2007 || Mount Lemmon || Mount Lemmon Survey ||  || align=right | 3.5 km || 
|-id=044 bgcolor=#E9E9E9
| 571044 ||  || — || December 15, 2006 || Kitt Peak || Spacewatch ||  || align=right | 1.1 km || 
|-id=045 bgcolor=#d6d6d6
| 571045 ||  || — || August 1, 2017 || Haleakala || Pan-STARRS ||  || align=right | 3.5 km || 
|-id=046 bgcolor=#E9E9E9
| 571046 ||  || — || January 10, 2007 || Mount Lemmon || Mount Lemmon Survey ||  || align=right data-sort-value="0.87" | 870 m || 
|-id=047 bgcolor=#fefefe
| 571047 ||  || — || January 15, 2007 || Mauna Kea || Mauna Kea Obs. ||  || align=right data-sort-value="0.54" | 540 m || 
|-id=048 bgcolor=#d6d6d6
| 571048 ||  || — || September 5, 2016 || Mount Lemmon || Mount Lemmon Survey ||  || align=right | 2.6 km || 
|-id=049 bgcolor=#E9E9E9
| 571049 ||  || — || January 10, 2007 || Kitt Peak || Spacewatch ||  || align=right | 1.3 km || 
|-id=050 bgcolor=#fefefe
| 571050 ||  || — || January 10, 2007 || Kitt Peak || Spacewatch ||  || align=right data-sort-value="0.52" | 520 m || 
|-id=051 bgcolor=#E9E9E9
| 571051 ||  || — || January 9, 2007 || Kitt Peak || Spacewatch ||  || align=right data-sort-value="0.76" | 760 m || 
|-id=052 bgcolor=#d6d6d6
| 571052 ||  || — || November 17, 2006 || Mount Lemmon || Mount Lemmon Survey ||  || align=right | 2.8 km || 
|-id=053 bgcolor=#d6d6d6
| 571053 ||  || — || January 16, 2007 || Mount Lemmon || Mount Lemmon Survey ||  || align=right | 3.0 km || 
|-id=054 bgcolor=#E9E9E9
| 571054 ||  || — || December 13, 2006 || Kitt Peak || Spacewatch ||  || align=right | 1.5 km || 
|-id=055 bgcolor=#E9E9E9
| 571055 ||  || — || January 9, 2007 || Kitt Peak || Spacewatch ||  || align=right | 1.1 km || 
|-id=056 bgcolor=#E9E9E9
| 571056 ||  || — || January 17, 2007 || Kitt Peak || Spacewatch ||  || align=right | 1.4 km || 
|-id=057 bgcolor=#E9E9E9
| 571057 ||  || — || January 17, 2007 || Kitt Peak || Spacewatch ||  || align=right | 1.3 km || 
|-id=058 bgcolor=#d6d6d6
| 571058 ||  || — || January 24, 2007 || Mount Lemmon || Mount Lemmon Survey ||  || align=right | 2.3 km || 
|-id=059 bgcolor=#fefefe
| 571059 ||  || — || January 24, 2007 || Mount Lemmon || Mount Lemmon Survey ||  || align=right data-sort-value="0.75" | 750 m || 
|-id=060 bgcolor=#E9E9E9
| 571060 ||  || — || January 17, 2007 || Kitt Peak || Spacewatch ||  || align=right | 1.3 km || 
|-id=061 bgcolor=#d6d6d6
| 571061 ||  || — || January 9, 2007 || Mount Lemmon || Mount Lemmon Survey ||  || align=right | 3.2 km || 
|-id=062 bgcolor=#d6d6d6
| 571062 ||  || — || January 24, 2007 || Mount Lemmon || Mount Lemmon Survey ||  || align=right | 2.5 km || 
|-id=063 bgcolor=#E9E9E9
| 571063 ||  || — || January 25, 2007 || Kitt Peak || Spacewatch ||  || align=right data-sort-value="0.81" | 810 m || 
|-id=064 bgcolor=#d6d6d6
| 571064 ||  || — || July 21, 2004 || Siding Spring || SSS ||  || align=right | 2.9 km || 
|-id=065 bgcolor=#d6d6d6
| 571065 ||  || — || January 27, 2007 || Mount Lemmon || Mount Lemmon Survey ||  || align=right | 2.7 km || 
|-id=066 bgcolor=#d6d6d6
| 571066 ||  || — || January 27, 2007 || Mount Lemmon || Mount Lemmon Survey ||  || align=right | 2.8 km || 
|-id=067 bgcolor=#fefefe
| 571067 ||  || — || January 27, 2007 || Mount Lemmon || Mount Lemmon Survey || H || align=right data-sort-value="0.54" | 540 m || 
|-id=068 bgcolor=#d6d6d6
| 571068 ||  || — || January 28, 2007 || Mount Lemmon || Mount Lemmon Survey ||  || align=right | 2.6 km || 
|-id=069 bgcolor=#d6d6d6
| 571069 ||  || — || January 16, 2007 || Socorro || LINEAR || Tj (2.98) || align=right | 3.7 km || 
|-id=070 bgcolor=#fefefe
| 571070 ||  || — || January 28, 2007 || Mount Lemmon || Mount Lemmon Survey ||  || align=right data-sort-value="0.60" | 600 m || 
|-id=071 bgcolor=#E9E9E9
| 571071 ||  || — || January 19, 2007 || Mauna Kea || Mauna Kea Obs. ||  || align=right data-sort-value="0.84" | 840 m || 
|-id=072 bgcolor=#E9E9E9
| 571072 ||  || — || December 27, 2006 || Mount Lemmon || Mount Lemmon Survey ||  || align=right | 1.5 km || 
|-id=073 bgcolor=#E9E9E9
| 571073 ||  || — || February 21, 2007 || Mount Lemmon || Mount Lemmon Survey ||  || align=right data-sort-value="0.94" | 940 m || 
|-id=074 bgcolor=#E9E9E9
| 571074 ||  || — || April 7, 2008 || Kitt Peak || Spacewatch ||  || align=right data-sort-value="0.86" | 860 m || 
|-id=075 bgcolor=#d6d6d6
| 571075 ||  || — || December 21, 2006 || Kitt Peak || L. H. Wasserman ||  || align=right | 3.9 km || 
|-id=076 bgcolor=#d6d6d6
| 571076 ||  || — || January 27, 2007 || Mount Lemmon || Mount Lemmon Survey ||  || align=right | 3.5 km || 
|-id=077 bgcolor=#d6d6d6
| 571077 ||  || — || September 29, 2010 || Mount Lemmon || Mount Lemmon Survey ||  || align=right | 2.9 km || 
|-id=078 bgcolor=#fefefe
| 571078 ||  || — || January 27, 2007 || Mount Lemmon || Mount Lemmon Survey ||  || align=right data-sort-value="0.75" | 750 m || 
|-id=079 bgcolor=#d6d6d6
| 571079 ||  || — || January 24, 2007 || Mount Lemmon || Mount Lemmon Survey ||  || align=right | 2.3 km || 
|-id=080 bgcolor=#d6d6d6
| 571080 ||  || — || January 17, 2007 || Kitt Peak || Spacewatch ||  || align=right | 2.3 km || 
|-id=081 bgcolor=#E9E9E9
| 571081 ||  || — || January 17, 2011 || Mount Lemmon || Mount Lemmon Survey ||  || align=right | 1.1 km || 
|-id=082 bgcolor=#d6d6d6
| 571082 ||  || — || April 27, 2008 || Kitt Peak || Spacewatch ||  || align=right | 2.7 km || 
|-id=083 bgcolor=#fefefe
| 571083 ||  || — || January 9, 2007 || Kitt Peak || Spacewatch ||  || align=right data-sort-value="0.53" | 530 m || 
|-id=084 bgcolor=#E9E9E9
| 571084 ||  || — || January 17, 2007 || Kitt Peak || Spacewatch ||  || align=right data-sort-value="0.79" | 790 m || 
|-id=085 bgcolor=#FA8072
| 571085 ||  || — || January 17, 2007 || Palomar || NEAT || H || align=right data-sort-value="0.52" | 520 m || 
|-id=086 bgcolor=#d6d6d6
| 571086 ||  || — || January 27, 2007 || Kitt Peak || Spacewatch ||  || align=right | 2.1 km || 
|-id=087 bgcolor=#fefefe
| 571087 ||  || — || December 4, 2012 || Mount Lemmon || Mount Lemmon Survey ||  || align=right data-sort-value="0.51" | 510 m || 
|-id=088 bgcolor=#fefefe
| 571088 ||  || — || January 27, 2007 || Kitt Peak || Spacewatch ||  || align=right data-sort-value="0.57" | 570 m || 
|-id=089 bgcolor=#E9E9E9
| 571089 ||  || — || January 17, 2007 || Kitt Peak || Spacewatch ||  || align=right data-sort-value="0.82" | 820 m || 
|-id=090 bgcolor=#d6d6d6
| 571090 ||  || — || January 12, 2018 || Haleakala || Pan-STARRS ||  || align=right | 2.6 km || 
|-id=091 bgcolor=#d6d6d6
| 571091 ||  || — || September 25, 2016 || Haleakala || Pan-STARRS ||  || align=right | 2.8 km || 
|-id=092 bgcolor=#d6d6d6
| 571092 ||  || — || January 19, 2013 || Kitt Peak || Spacewatch ||  || align=right | 2.3 km || 
|-id=093 bgcolor=#d6d6d6
| 571093 ||  || — || August 11, 2015 || Haleakala || Pan-STARRS ||  || align=right | 2.5 km || 
|-id=094 bgcolor=#fefefe
| 571094 ||  || — || April 5, 2014 || Haleakala || Pan-STARRS ||  || align=right data-sort-value="0.55" | 550 m || 
|-id=095 bgcolor=#fefefe
| 571095 ||  || — || August 12, 2015 || Haleakala || Pan-STARRS ||  || align=right data-sort-value="0.48" | 480 m || 
|-id=096 bgcolor=#d6d6d6
| 571096 ||  || — || January 26, 2007 || Kitt Peak || Spacewatch ||  || align=right | 2.5 km || 
|-id=097 bgcolor=#E9E9E9
| 571097 ||  || — || January 17, 2007 || Kitt Peak || Spacewatch ||  || align=right data-sort-value="0.81" | 810 m || 
|-id=098 bgcolor=#d6d6d6
| 571098 ||  || — || January 27, 2007 || Mount Lemmon || Mount Lemmon Survey ||  || align=right | 2.6 km || 
|-id=099 bgcolor=#d6d6d6
| 571099 ||  || — || January 24, 2007 || Catalina || CSS ||  || align=right | 2.5 km || 
|-id=100 bgcolor=#E9E9E9
| 571100 ||  || — || January 27, 2007 || Kitt Peak || Spacewatch ||  || align=right data-sort-value="0.93" | 930 m || 
|}

571101–571200 

|-bgcolor=#E9E9E9
| 571101 ||  || — || January 28, 2007 || Mount Lemmon || Mount Lemmon Survey ||  || align=right | 1.3 km || 
|-id=102 bgcolor=#E9E9E9
| 571102 ||  || — || February 6, 2007 || Mount Lemmon || Mount Lemmon Survey ||  || align=right | 1.5 km || 
|-id=103 bgcolor=#d6d6d6
| 571103 ||  || — || February 7, 2007 || Kitt Peak || Spacewatch ||  || align=right | 2.6 km || 
|-id=104 bgcolor=#fefefe
| 571104 ||  || — || February 7, 2007 || Mount Lemmon || Mount Lemmon Survey ||  || align=right data-sort-value="0.68" | 680 m || 
|-id=105 bgcolor=#E9E9E9
| 571105 ||  || — || February 6, 2003 || Kitt Peak || Spacewatch ||  || align=right | 1.0 km || 
|-id=106 bgcolor=#fefefe
| 571106 ||  || — || February 8, 2007 || Kitt Peak || Spacewatch ||  || align=right data-sort-value="0.49" | 490 m || 
|-id=107 bgcolor=#E9E9E9
| 571107 ||  || — || February 8, 2007 || Kitt Peak || Spacewatch ||  || align=right | 1.1 km || 
|-id=108 bgcolor=#E9E9E9
| 571108 ||  || — || February 8, 2007 || Mount Lemmon || Mount Lemmon Survey ||  || align=right | 1.2 km || 
|-id=109 bgcolor=#E9E9E9
| 571109 ||  || — || February 8, 2007 || Mount Lemmon || Mount Lemmon Survey ||  || align=right | 2.0 km || 
|-id=110 bgcolor=#E9E9E9
| 571110 ||  || — || February 9, 2007 || Marly || P. Kocher || EUN || align=right | 1.3 km || 
|-id=111 bgcolor=#E9E9E9
| 571111 ||  || — || January 27, 2007 || Kitt Peak || Spacewatch ||  || align=right data-sort-value="0.65" | 650 m || 
|-id=112 bgcolor=#d6d6d6
| 571112 ||  || — || December 20, 2006 || Catalina || CSS || Tj (2.99) || align=right | 3.0 km || 
|-id=113 bgcolor=#E9E9E9
| 571113 ||  || — || February 7, 2007 || Mount Lemmon || Mount Lemmon Survey ||  || align=right data-sort-value="0.78" | 780 m || 
|-id=114 bgcolor=#E9E9E9
| 571114 ||  || — || February 9, 2007 || Mount Lemmon || Mount Lemmon Survey ||  || align=right | 1.0 km || 
|-id=115 bgcolor=#E9E9E9
| 571115 ||  || — || February 10, 2007 || Palomar || NEAT ||  || align=right | 1.6 km || 
|-id=116 bgcolor=#E9E9E9
| 571116 ||  || — || February 10, 2007 || Mount Lemmon || Mount Lemmon Survey ||  || align=right | 1.5 km || 
|-id=117 bgcolor=#E9E9E9
| 571117 ||  || — || December 13, 2006 || Mauna Kea || Mauna Kea Obs. ||  || align=right | 1.5 km || 
|-id=118 bgcolor=#E9E9E9
| 571118 ||  || — || February 14, 2007 || Mauna Kea || Mauna Kea Obs. ||  || align=right data-sort-value="0.75" | 750 m || 
|-id=119 bgcolor=#d6d6d6
| 571119 ||  || — || February 14, 2007 || Mauna Kea || Mauna Kea Obs. ||  || align=right | 2.3 km || 
|-id=120 bgcolor=#fefefe
| 571120 ||  || — || January 27, 2007 || Kitt Peak || Spacewatch ||  || align=right data-sort-value="0.68" | 680 m || 
|-id=121 bgcolor=#d6d6d6
| 571121 ||  || — || March 10, 2007 || Mount Lemmon || Mount Lemmon Survey ||  || align=right | 2.7 km || 
|-id=122 bgcolor=#E9E9E9
| 571122 ||  || — || February 10, 2007 || Mount Lemmon || Mount Lemmon Survey ||  || align=right data-sort-value="0.98" | 980 m || 
|-id=123 bgcolor=#fefefe
| 571123 ||  || — || February 10, 2007 || Mount Lemmon || Mount Lemmon Survey ||  || align=right data-sort-value="0.65" | 650 m || 
|-id=124 bgcolor=#fefefe
| 571124 ||  || — || February 10, 2007 || Mount Lemmon || Mount Lemmon Survey ||  || align=right data-sort-value="0.59" | 590 m || 
|-id=125 bgcolor=#d6d6d6
| 571125 ||  || — || February 13, 2007 || Mount Lemmon || Mount Lemmon Survey ||  || align=right | 3.0 km || 
|-id=126 bgcolor=#d6d6d6
| 571126 ||  || — || March 10, 2008 || Mount Lemmon || Mount Lemmon Survey ||  || align=right | 2.6 km || 
|-id=127 bgcolor=#E9E9E9
| 571127 ||  || — || February 9, 2007 || Catalina || CSS ||  || align=right | 1.0 km || 
|-id=128 bgcolor=#d6d6d6
| 571128 ||  || — || February 10, 2007 || Mount Lemmon || Mount Lemmon Survey || 7:4 || align=right | 3.3 km || 
|-id=129 bgcolor=#d6d6d6
| 571129 ||  || — || March 17, 2002 || Kitt Peak || Spacewatch ||  || align=right | 2.4 km || 
|-id=130 bgcolor=#d6d6d6
| 571130 ||  || — || February 6, 2007 || Mount Lemmon || Mount Lemmon Survey ||  || align=right | 2.2 km || 
|-id=131 bgcolor=#E9E9E9
| 571131 ||  || — || February 10, 2007 || Mount Lemmon || Mount Lemmon Survey ||  || align=right | 1.2 km || 
|-id=132 bgcolor=#d6d6d6
| 571132 ||  || — || February 17, 2007 || Kitt Peak || Spacewatch ||  || align=right | 2.5 km || 
|-id=133 bgcolor=#d6d6d6
| 571133 ||  || — || February 17, 2007 || Kitt Peak || Spacewatch ||  || align=right | 2.9 km || 
|-id=134 bgcolor=#d6d6d6
| 571134 ||  || — || February 17, 2007 || Kitt Peak || Spacewatch ||  || align=right | 2.6 km || 
|-id=135 bgcolor=#E9E9E9
| 571135 ||  || — || February 17, 2007 || Kitt Peak || Spacewatch ||  || align=right | 1.5 km || 
|-id=136 bgcolor=#E9E9E9
| 571136 ||  || — || February 17, 2007 || Kitt Peak || Spacewatch ||  || align=right | 1.3 km || 
|-id=137 bgcolor=#E9E9E9
| 571137 ||  || — || February 17, 2007 || Kitt Peak || Spacewatch ||  || align=right | 1.5 km || 
|-id=138 bgcolor=#fefefe
| 571138 ||  || — || February 17, 2007 || Kitt Peak || Spacewatch || H || align=right data-sort-value="0.54" | 540 m || 
|-id=139 bgcolor=#E9E9E9
| 571139 ||  || — || September 10, 2004 || Kitt Peak || Spacewatch ||  || align=right | 1.2 km || 
|-id=140 bgcolor=#fefefe
| 571140 ||  || — || January 27, 2007 || Mount Lemmon || Mount Lemmon Survey || H || align=right data-sort-value="0.66" | 660 m || 
|-id=141 bgcolor=#d6d6d6
| 571141 ||  || — || February 21, 2007 || Mount Lemmon || Mount Lemmon Survey ||  || align=right | 2.9 km || 
|-id=142 bgcolor=#d6d6d6
| 571142 ||  || — || January 28, 2007 || Mount Lemmon || Mount Lemmon Survey ||  || align=right | 2.4 km || 
|-id=143 bgcolor=#d6d6d6
| 571143 ||  || — || February 21, 2007 || Kitt Peak || Spacewatch ||  || align=right | 2.0 km || 
|-id=144 bgcolor=#fefefe
| 571144 ||  || — || January 10, 2003 || Kitt Peak || Spacewatch ||  || align=right data-sort-value="0.73" | 730 m || 
|-id=145 bgcolor=#fefefe
| 571145 ||  || — || February 21, 2007 || Kitt Peak || Spacewatch ||  || align=right data-sort-value="0.62" | 620 m || 
|-id=146 bgcolor=#fefefe
| 571146 ||  || — || September 25, 1998 || Apache Point || SDSS Collaboration ||  || align=right data-sort-value="0.61" | 610 m || 
|-id=147 bgcolor=#fefefe
| 571147 ||  || — || February 21, 2007 || Kitt Peak || Spacewatch ||  || align=right data-sort-value="0.49" | 490 m || 
|-id=148 bgcolor=#d6d6d6
| 571148 ||  || — || February 23, 2007 || Mount Lemmon || Mount Lemmon Survey ||  || align=right | 2.0 km || 
|-id=149 bgcolor=#E9E9E9
| 571149 ||  || — || February 23, 2007 || Mount Lemmon || Mount Lemmon Survey ||  || align=right | 1.1 km || 
|-id=150 bgcolor=#E9E9E9
| 571150 ||  || — || February 25, 2007 || Mount Lemmon || Mount Lemmon Survey ||  || align=right | 1.1 km || 
|-id=151 bgcolor=#E9E9E9
| 571151 ||  || — || October 1, 2005 || Kitt Peak || Spacewatch ||  || align=right data-sort-value="0.95" | 950 m || 
|-id=152 bgcolor=#E9E9E9
| 571152 ||  || — || January 23, 2007 || Bergisch Gladbach || W. Bickel ||  || align=right data-sort-value="0.85" | 850 m || 
|-id=153 bgcolor=#E9E9E9
| 571153 ||  || — || February 23, 2007 || Mount Lemmon || Mount Lemmon Survey ||  || align=right | 1.5 km || 
|-id=154 bgcolor=#E9E9E9
| 571154 ||  || — || September 18, 2001 || Kitt Peak || Spacewatch ||  || align=right data-sort-value="0.82" | 820 m || 
|-id=155 bgcolor=#fefefe
| 571155 ||  || — || February 23, 2007 || Mount Lemmon || Mount Lemmon Survey ||  || align=right data-sort-value="0.72" | 720 m || 
|-id=156 bgcolor=#E9E9E9
| 571156 ||  || — || February 17, 2007 || Kitt Peak || Spacewatch ||  || align=right | 1.2 km || 
|-id=157 bgcolor=#E9E9E9
| 571157 ||  || — || February 16, 2007 || Catalina || CSS ||  || align=right | 1.6 km || 
|-id=158 bgcolor=#E9E9E9
| 571158 ||  || — || February 16, 2007 || Catalina || CSS ||  || align=right | 1.2 km || 
|-id=159 bgcolor=#fefefe
| 571159 ||  || — || September 23, 2005 || Kitt Peak || Spacewatch ||  || align=right data-sort-value="0.63" | 630 m || 
|-id=160 bgcolor=#d6d6d6
| 571160 ||  || — || February 25, 2007 || Mount Lemmon || Mount Lemmon Survey ||  || align=right | 2.5 km || 
|-id=161 bgcolor=#d6d6d6
| 571161 ||  || — || February 25, 2007 || Mount Lemmon || Mount Lemmon Survey ||  || align=right | 2.7 km || 
|-id=162 bgcolor=#E9E9E9
| 571162 ||  || — || January 28, 2011 || Mount Lemmon || Mount Lemmon Survey ||  || align=right | 1.4 km || 
|-id=163 bgcolor=#E9E9E9
| 571163 ||  || — || February 25, 2007 || Kitt Peak || Spacewatch ||  || align=right | 1.8 km || 
|-id=164 bgcolor=#fefefe
| 571164 ||  || — || March 29, 2008 || Kitt Peak || Spacewatch ||  || align=right data-sort-value="0.98" | 980 m || 
|-id=165 bgcolor=#d6d6d6
| 571165 ||  || — || February 22, 2007 || Mount Lemmon || Mount Lemmon Survey ||  || align=right | 3.3 km || 
|-id=166 bgcolor=#E9E9E9
| 571166 ||  || — || February 9, 2007 || Kitt Peak || Spacewatch ||  || align=right data-sort-value="0.99" | 990 m || 
|-id=167 bgcolor=#fefefe
| 571167 ||  || — || November 19, 2009 || Mount Lemmon || Mount Lemmon Survey ||  || align=right data-sort-value="0.67" | 670 m || 
|-id=168 bgcolor=#d6d6d6
| 571168 ||  || — || December 29, 2011 || Mount Lemmon || Mount Lemmon Survey ||  || align=right | 2.6 km || 
|-id=169 bgcolor=#d6d6d6
| 571169 ||  || — || February 17, 2007 || Kitt Peak || Spacewatch ||  || align=right | 2.2 km || 
|-id=170 bgcolor=#d6d6d6
| 571170 ||  || — || September 19, 1998 || Apache Point || SDSS Collaboration ||  || align=right | 2.0 km || 
|-id=171 bgcolor=#fefefe
| 571171 ||  || — || March 20, 2017 || Haleakala || Pan-STARRS ||  || align=right data-sort-value="0.47" | 470 m || 
|-id=172 bgcolor=#d6d6d6
| 571172 ||  || — || February 14, 2013 || Haleakala || Pan-STARRS ||  || align=right | 2.7 km || 
|-id=173 bgcolor=#fefefe
| 571173 ||  || — || October 22, 2012 || Haleakala || Pan-STARRS ||  || align=right data-sort-value="0.46" | 460 m || 
|-id=174 bgcolor=#E9E9E9
| 571174 ||  || — || February 21, 2007 || Mount Lemmon || Mount Lemmon Survey ||  || align=right | 1.1 km || 
|-id=175 bgcolor=#E9E9E9
| 571175 ||  || — || February 25, 2007 || Mount Lemmon || Mount Lemmon Survey ||  || align=right | 1.0 km || 
|-id=176 bgcolor=#E9E9E9
| 571176 ||  || — || February 16, 2007 || Mount Lemmon || Mount Lemmon Survey ||  || align=right | 1.4 km || 
|-id=177 bgcolor=#C2FFFF
| 571177 ||  || — || February 21, 2007 || Kitt Peak || Spacewatch || L5 || align=right | 6.7 km || 
|-id=178 bgcolor=#E9E9E9
| 571178 ||  || — || February 23, 2007 || Mount Lemmon || Mount Lemmon Survey ||  || align=right | 1.2 km || 
|-id=179 bgcolor=#fefefe
| 571179 ||  || — || April 21, 2002 || Palomar || NEAT || H || align=right data-sort-value="0.90" | 900 m || 
|-id=180 bgcolor=#E9E9E9
| 571180 ||  || — || April 5, 2003 || Kitt Peak || Spacewatch ||  || align=right | 1.5 km || 
|-id=181 bgcolor=#E9E9E9
| 571181 ||  || — || September 29, 2005 || Catalina || CSS ||  || align=right | 1.5 km || 
|-id=182 bgcolor=#fefefe
| 571182 ||  || — || August 31, 2005 || Kitt Peak || Spacewatch ||  || align=right data-sort-value="0.82" | 820 m || 
|-id=183 bgcolor=#E9E9E9
| 571183 ||  || — || March 9, 2007 || Mount Lemmon || Mount Lemmon Survey ||  || align=right | 1.3 km || 
|-id=184 bgcolor=#E9E9E9
| 571184 ||  || — || April 27, 2003 || Apache Point || SDSS Collaboration ||  || align=right | 1.6 km || 
|-id=185 bgcolor=#d6d6d6
| 571185 ||  || — || February 21, 2007 || Mount Lemmon || Mount Lemmon Survey ||  || align=right | 2.7 km || 
|-id=186 bgcolor=#d6d6d6
| 571186 ||  || — || March 10, 2007 || Mount Lemmon || Mount Lemmon Survey ||  || align=right | 2.9 km || 
|-id=187 bgcolor=#E9E9E9
| 571187 ||  || — || March 10, 2007 || Mount Lemmon || Mount Lemmon Survey ||  || align=right | 1.3 km || 
|-id=188 bgcolor=#d6d6d6
| 571188 ||  || — || March 12, 2007 || Altschwendt || W. Ries || TIR || align=right | 2.5 km || 
|-id=189 bgcolor=#fefefe
| 571189 ||  || — || March 9, 2007 || Kitt Peak || Spacewatch ||  || align=right data-sort-value="0.66" | 660 m || 
|-id=190 bgcolor=#d6d6d6
| 571190 ||  || — || March 9, 2007 || Kitt Peak || Spacewatch ||  || align=right | 2.7 km || 
|-id=191 bgcolor=#d6d6d6
| 571191 ||  || — || March 10, 2007 || Mount Lemmon || Mount Lemmon Survey || 7:4 || align=right | 3.2 km || 
|-id=192 bgcolor=#E9E9E9
| 571192 ||  || — || August 13, 2004 || Cerro Tololo || Cerro Tololo Obs. ||  || align=right | 1.5 km || 
|-id=193 bgcolor=#d6d6d6
| 571193 ||  || — || February 7, 2007 || Mount Lemmon || Mount Lemmon Survey ||  || align=right | 3.7 km || 
|-id=194 bgcolor=#fefefe
| 571194 ||  || — || February 23, 2007 || Mount Lemmon || Mount Lemmon Survey ||  || align=right data-sort-value="0.59" | 590 m || 
|-id=195 bgcolor=#fefefe
| 571195 ||  || — || March 10, 2007 || Kitt Peak || Spacewatch ||  || align=right data-sort-value="0.64" | 640 m || 
|-id=196 bgcolor=#fefefe
| 571196 ||  || — || February 25, 2007 || Kitt Peak || Spacewatch ||  || align=right data-sort-value="0.74" | 740 m || 
|-id=197 bgcolor=#E9E9E9
| 571197 ||  || — || March 10, 2007 || Kitt Peak || Spacewatch ||  || align=right | 1.2 km || 
|-id=198 bgcolor=#E9E9E9
| 571198 ||  || — || March 10, 2007 || Kitt Peak || Spacewatch ||  || align=right | 1.5 km || 
|-id=199 bgcolor=#E9E9E9
| 571199 ||  || — || March 10, 2007 || Mount Lemmon || Mount Lemmon Survey ||  || align=right | 1.3 km || 
|-id=200 bgcolor=#FA8072
| 571200 ||  || — || February 27, 2007 || Kitt Peak || Spacewatch ||  || align=right data-sort-value="0.30" | 300 m || 
|}

571201–571300 

|-bgcolor=#fefefe
| 571201 ||  || — || March 10, 2007 || Kitt Peak || Spacewatch ||  || align=right data-sort-value="0.68" | 680 m || 
|-id=202 bgcolor=#fefefe
| 571202 ||  || — || March 10, 2007 || Mount Lemmon || Mount Lemmon Survey ||  || align=right data-sort-value="0.67" | 670 m || 
|-id=203 bgcolor=#E9E9E9
| 571203 ||  || — || March 12, 2007 || Kitt Peak || Spacewatch ||  || align=right | 1.3 km || 
|-id=204 bgcolor=#E9E9E9
| 571204 ||  || — || March 12, 2007 || Kitt Peak || Spacewatch ||  || align=right | 1.7 km || 
|-id=205 bgcolor=#fefefe
| 571205 ||  || — || March 12, 2007 || Mount Lemmon || Mount Lemmon Survey ||  || align=right data-sort-value="0.69" | 690 m || 
|-id=206 bgcolor=#E9E9E9
| 571206 ||  || — || March 12, 2007 || Kitt Peak || Spacewatch ||  || align=right | 1.9 km || 
|-id=207 bgcolor=#d6d6d6
| 571207 ||  || — || March 13, 2007 || Kitt Peak || Spacewatch || 7:4 || align=right | 3.2 km || 
|-id=208 bgcolor=#d6d6d6
| 571208 ||  || — || August 14, 2004 || Cerro Tololo || Cerro Tololo Obs. ||  || align=right | 2.4 km || 
|-id=209 bgcolor=#E9E9E9
| 571209 ||  || — || March 10, 2007 || Mount Lemmon || Mount Lemmon Survey ||  || align=right | 1.9 km || 
|-id=210 bgcolor=#d6d6d6
| 571210 ||  || — || February 23, 2007 || Mount Lemmon || Mount Lemmon Survey ||  || align=right | 3.2 km || 
|-id=211 bgcolor=#C2FFFF
| 571211 ||  || — || March 11, 2007 || Mount Lemmon || Mount Lemmon Survey || L5 || align=right | 8.0 km || 
|-id=212 bgcolor=#E9E9E9
| 571212 ||  || — || March 11, 2007 || Kitt Peak || Spacewatch ||  || align=right | 1.2 km || 
|-id=213 bgcolor=#fefefe
| 571213 ||  || — || March 13, 2007 || Mount Lemmon || Mount Lemmon Survey ||  || align=right data-sort-value="0.63" | 630 m || 
|-id=214 bgcolor=#d6d6d6
| 571214 ||  || — || March 14, 2007 || Mount Lemmon || Mount Lemmon Survey ||  || align=right | 2.4 km || 
|-id=215 bgcolor=#E9E9E9
| 571215 ||  || — || September 24, 2005 || Kitt Peak || Spacewatch ||  || align=right data-sort-value="0.96" | 960 m || 
|-id=216 bgcolor=#fefefe
| 571216 ||  || — || March 14, 2007 || Mount Lemmon || Mount Lemmon Survey ||  || align=right data-sort-value="0.64" | 640 m || 
|-id=217 bgcolor=#E9E9E9
| 571217 ||  || — || March 14, 2007 || Mount Lemmon || Mount Lemmon Survey ||  || align=right | 1.4 km || 
|-id=218 bgcolor=#E9E9E9
| 571218 ||  || — || March 9, 2007 || Mount Lemmon || Mount Lemmon Survey ||  || align=right | 1.3 km || 
|-id=219 bgcolor=#fefefe
| 571219 ||  || — || March 10, 2007 || Kitt Peak || Spacewatch ||  || align=right data-sort-value="0.80" | 800 m || 
|-id=220 bgcolor=#E9E9E9
| 571220 ||  || — || March 11, 2007 || Mount Lemmon || Mount Lemmon Survey ||  || align=right data-sort-value="0.67" | 670 m || 
|-id=221 bgcolor=#d6d6d6
| 571221 ||  || — || January 28, 2007 || Mount Lemmon || Mount Lemmon Survey ||  || align=right | 2.5 km || 
|-id=222 bgcolor=#fefefe
| 571222 ||  || — || February 9, 2007 || Kitt Peak || Spacewatch ||  || align=right data-sort-value="0.61" | 610 m || 
|-id=223 bgcolor=#d6d6d6
| 571223 ||  || — || March 12, 2007 || Mount Lemmon || Mount Lemmon Survey ||  || align=right | 2.8 km || 
|-id=224 bgcolor=#fefefe
| 571224 ||  || — || March 12, 2007 || Kitt Peak || Spacewatch ||  || align=right data-sort-value="0.62" | 620 m || 
|-id=225 bgcolor=#fefefe
| 571225 ||  || — || March 13, 2007 || Mount Lemmon || Mount Lemmon Survey ||  || align=right data-sort-value="0.90" | 900 m || 
|-id=226 bgcolor=#fefefe
| 571226 ||  || — || March 15, 2007 || Kitt Peak || Spacewatch ||  || align=right data-sort-value="0.59" | 590 m || 
|-id=227 bgcolor=#E9E9E9
| 571227 ||  || — || March 16, 2007 || Catalina || CSS || JUN || align=right | 1.1 km || 
|-id=228 bgcolor=#C2FFFF
| 571228 ||  || — || January 30, 2006 || Kitt Peak || Spacewatch || L5 || align=right | 7.2 km || 
|-id=229 bgcolor=#d6d6d6
| 571229 ||  || — || March 13, 2007 || Kitt Peak || Spacewatch || 7:4 || align=right | 3.0 km || 
|-id=230 bgcolor=#fefefe
| 571230 ||  || — || September 14, 2005 || Kitt Peak || Spacewatch ||  || align=right data-sort-value="0.71" | 710 m || 
|-id=231 bgcolor=#E9E9E9
| 571231 ||  || — || March 14, 2007 || Kitt Peak || Spacewatch ||  || align=right | 1.1 km || 
|-id=232 bgcolor=#E9E9E9
| 571232 ||  || — || March 10, 2007 || Kitt Peak || Spacewatch ||  || align=right | 1.3 km || 
|-id=233 bgcolor=#d6d6d6
| 571233 ||  || — || March 14, 2007 || Kitt Peak || Spacewatch ||  || align=right | 2.8 km || 
|-id=234 bgcolor=#fefefe
| 571234 ||  || — || September 15, 1998 || Kitt Peak || Spacewatch ||  || align=right data-sort-value="0.77" | 770 m || 
|-id=235 bgcolor=#E9E9E9
| 571235 ||  || — || March 14, 2007 || Kitt Peak || Spacewatch ||  || align=right | 1.4 km || 
|-id=236 bgcolor=#fefefe
| 571236 ||  || — || February 23, 2007 || Kitt Peak || Spacewatch ||  || align=right data-sort-value="0.53" | 530 m || 
|-id=237 bgcolor=#fefefe
| 571237 ||  || — || March 15, 2007 || Mount Lemmon || Mount Lemmon Survey ||  || align=right data-sort-value="0.98" | 980 m || 
|-id=238 bgcolor=#d6d6d6
| 571238 ||  || — || March 15, 2007 || Mount Lemmon || Mount Lemmon Survey ||  || align=right | 2.7 km || 
|-id=239 bgcolor=#E9E9E9
| 571239 ||  || — || October 10, 2004 || Kitt Peak || Spacewatch ||  || align=right | 1.5 km || 
|-id=240 bgcolor=#fefefe
| 571240 ||  || — || March 9, 2007 || Kitt Peak || Spacewatch ||  || align=right data-sort-value="0.74" | 740 m || 
|-id=241 bgcolor=#d6d6d6
| 571241 ||  || — || March 11, 2007 || Kitt Peak || Spacewatch ||  || align=right | 2.5 km || 
|-id=242 bgcolor=#fefefe
| 571242 ||  || — || March 14, 2007 || Kitt Peak || Spacewatch ||  || align=right data-sort-value="0.64" | 640 m || 
|-id=243 bgcolor=#fefefe
| 571243 ||  || — || January 7, 2000 || Kitt Peak || Spacewatch ||  || align=right data-sort-value="0.80" | 800 m || 
|-id=244 bgcolor=#d6d6d6
| 571244 ||  || — || March 14, 2007 || Mount Lemmon || Mount Lemmon Survey || Tj (2.93) || align=right | 2.7 km || 
|-id=245 bgcolor=#E9E9E9
| 571245 ||  || — || March 11, 2007 || Mount Lemmon || Mount Lemmon Survey ||  || align=right | 1.2 km || 
|-id=246 bgcolor=#fefefe
| 571246 ||  || — || March 9, 2007 || Mount Lemmon || Mount Lemmon Survey ||  || align=right data-sort-value="0.53" | 530 m || 
|-id=247 bgcolor=#fefefe
| 571247 ||  || — || October 18, 1995 || Kitt Peak || Spacewatch ||  || align=right data-sort-value="0.57" | 570 m || 
|-id=248 bgcolor=#E9E9E9
| 571248 ||  || — || March 15, 2007 || Mount Lemmon || Mount Lemmon Survey ||  || align=right | 1.2 km || 
|-id=249 bgcolor=#C2FFFF
| 571249 ||  || — || March 13, 2007 || Kitt Peak || Spacewatch || L5 || align=right | 8.0 km || 
|-id=250 bgcolor=#d6d6d6
| 571250 ||  || — || March 15, 2007 || Mount Lemmon || Mount Lemmon Survey ||  || align=right | 2.8 km || 
|-id=251 bgcolor=#d6d6d6
| 571251 ||  || — || August 18, 2009 || Kitt Peak || Spacewatch || 7:4 || align=right | 2.7 km || 
|-id=252 bgcolor=#d6d6d6
| 571252 ||  || — || August 25, 2014 || Haleakala || Pan-STARRS ||  || align=right | 2.7 km || 
|-id=253 bgcolor=#E9E9E9
| 571253 ||  || — || September 2, 2013 || Mount Lemmon || Mount Lemmon Survey ||  || align=right | 1.2 km || 
|-id=254 bgcolor=#d6d6d6
| 571254 ||  || — || September 11, 2010 || Mount Lemmon || Mount Lemmon Survey ||  || align=right | 2.6 km || 
|-id=255 bgcolor=#E9E9E9
| 571255 ||  || — || March 14, 2007 || Kitt Peak || Spacewatch ||  || align=right | 1.5 km || 
|-id=256 bgcolor=#E9E9E9
| 571256 ||  || — || March 16, 2016 || Haleakala || Pan-STARRS ||  || align=right | 1.5 km || 
|-id=257 bgcolor=#fefefe
| 571257 ||  || — || October 23, 2012 || Kitt Peak || Spacewatch ||  || align=right data-sort-value="0.75" | 750 m || 
|-id=258 bgcolor=#d6d6d6
| 571258 ||  || — || October 17, 2010 || Mount Lemmon || Mount Lemmon Survey ||  || align=right | 2.5 km || 
|-id=259 bgcolor=#E9E9E9
| 571259 ||  || — || September 9, 2013 || Haleakala || Pan-STARRS ||  || align=right data-sort-value="0.89" | 890 m || 
|-id=260 bgcolor=#d6d6d6
| 571260 ||  || — || March 8, 2013 || Haleakala || Pan-STARRS ||  || align=right | 2.5 km || 
|-id=261 bgcolor=#d6d6d6
| 571261 ||  || — || March 14, 2007 || Mount Lemmon || Mount Lemmon Survey ||  || align=right | 2.2 km || 
|-id=262 bgcolor=#E9E9E9
| 571262 ||  || — || January 13, 2011 || Kitt Peak || Spacewatch ||  || align=right | 1.4 km || 
|-id=263 bgcolor=#E9E9E9
| 571263 ||  || — || March 11, 2007 || Mount Lemmon || Mount Lemmon Survey ||  || align=right | 1.1 km || 
|-id=264 bgcolor=#d6d6d6
| 571264 ||  || — || May 29, 2008 || Mount Lemmon || Mount Lemmon Survey ||  || align=right | 2.6 km || 
|-id=265 bgcolor=#E9E9E9
| 571265 ||  || — || March 4, 2016 || Haleakala || Pan-STARRS ||  || align=right | 1.2 km || 
|-id=266 bgcolor=#E9E9E9
| 571266 ||  || — || March 14, 2007 || Mount Lemmon || Mount Lemmon Survey ||  || align=right | 1.4 km || 
|-id=267 bgcolor=#E9E9E9
| 571267 ||  || — || March 14, 2007 || Mount Lemmon || Mount Lemmon Survey ||  || align=right | 1.1 km || 
|-id=268 bgcolor=#d6d6d6
| 571268 ||  || — || March 9, 2007 || Mount Lemmon || Mount Lemmon Survey ||  || align=right | 2.1 km || 
|-id=269 bgcolor=#C2FFFF
| 571269 ||  || — || March 13, 2007 || Kitt Peak || Spacewatch || L5 || align=right | 7.2 km || 
|-id=270 bgcolor=#E9E9E9
| 571270 ||  || — || March 13, 2007 || Mount Lemmon || Mount Lemmon Survey ||  || align=right | 1.6 km || 
|-id=271 bgcolor=#E9E9E9
| 571271 ||  || — || March 17, 2007 || Anderson Mesa || LONEOS ||  || align=right | 1.5 km || 
|-id=272 bgcolor=#d6d6d6
| 571272 ||  || — || March 16, 2007 || Kitt Peak || Spacewatch ||  || align=right | 2.6 km || 
|-id=273 bgcolor=#E9E9E9
| 571273 ||  || — || March 16, 2007 || Kitt Peak || Spacewatch ||  || align=right | 1.1 km || 
|-id=274 bgcolor=#E9E9E9
| 571274 ||  || — || March 16, 2007 || Mount Lemmon || Mount Lemmon Survey ||  || align=right data-sort-value="0.89" | 890 m || 
|-id=275 bgcolor=#C2FFFF
| 571275 ||  || — || March 16, 2007 || Mount Lemmon || Mount Lemmon Survey || L5 || align=right | 7.7 km || 
|-id=276 bgcolor=#d6d6d6
| 571276 ||  || — || March 9, 2007 || Kitt Peak || Spacewatch ||  || align=right | 2.5 km || 
|-id=277 bgcolor=#E9E9E9
| 571277 ||  || — || March 16, 2007 || Kitt Peak || Spacewatch ||  || align=right | 1.6 km || 
|-id=278 bgcolor=#d6d6d6
| 571278 ||  || — || March 20, 2007 || Mount Lemmon || Mount Lemmon Survey ||  || align=right | 2.2 km || 
|-id=279 bgcolor=#d6d6d6
| 571279 ||  || — || September 11, 2004 || Kitt Peak || Spacewatch ||  || align=right | 2.9 km || 
|-id=280 bgcolor=#d6d6d6
| 571280 ||  || — || March 20, 2007 || Mount Lemmon || Mount Lemmon Survey ||  || align=right | 2.2 km || 
|-id=281 bgcolor=#d6d6d6
| 571281 ||  || — || March 25, 2007 || Mount Lemmon || Mount Lemmon Survey ||  || align=right | 2.3 km || 
|-id=282 bgcolor=#E9E9E9
| 571282 ||  || — || March 26, 2007 || Mount Lemmon || Mount Lemmon Survey ||  || align=right | 1.0 km || 
|-id=283 bgcolor=#fefefe
| 571283 ||  || — || March 30, 2007 || Siding Spring || SSS ||  || align=right | 1.3 km || 
|-id=284 bgcolor=#fefefe
| 571284 ||  || — || March 26, 2007 || Kitt Peak || Spacewatch ||  || align=right data-sort-value="0.53" | 530 m || 
|-id=285 bgcolor=#E9E9E9
| 571285 ||  || — || March 16, 2007 || Mount Lemmon || Mount Lemmon Survey ||  || align=right data-sort-value="0.75" | 750 m || 
|-id=286 bgcolor=#E9E9E9
| 571286 ||  || — || March 23, 2007 || Siding Spring || SSS ||  || align=right | 1.8 km || 
|-id=287 bgcolor=#E9E9E9
| 571287 ||  || — || March 26, 2007 || Kitt Peak || Spacewatch ||  || align=right | 1.2 km || 
|-id=288 bgcolor=#fefefe
| 571288 ||  || — || September 23, 2008 || Kitt Peak || Spacewatch ||  || align=right data-sort-value="0.82" | 820 m || 
|-id=289 bgcolor=#d6d6d6
| 571289 ||  || — || September 18, 2010 || Kitt Peak || Spacewatch ||  || align=right | 2.7 km || 
|-id=290 bgcolor=#d6d6d6
| 571290 ||  || — || August 28, 2015 || Haleakala || Pan-STARRS ||  || align=right | 3.3 km || 
|-id=291 bgcolor=#E9E9E9
| 571291 ||  || — || March 16, 2007 || Mount Lemmon || Mount Lemmon Survey ||  || align=right | 1.3 km || 
|-id=292 bgcolor=#fefefe
| 571292 ||  || — || September 12, 2015 || Haleakala || Pan-STARRS ||  || align=right data-sort-value="0.61" | 610 m || 
|-id=293 bgcolor=#fefefe
| 571293 ||  || — || April 10, 2014 || Haleakala || Pan-STARRS ||  || align=right data-sort-value="0.73" | 730 m || 
|-id=294 bgcolor=#fefefe
| 571294 ||  || — || September 3, 2008 || Kitt Peak || Spacewatch ||  || align=right data-sort-value="0.65" | 650 m || 
|-id=295 bgcolor=#E9E9E9
| 571295 ||  || — || January 28, 2011 || Catalina || CSS ||  || align=right | 1.5 km || 
|-id=296 bgcolor=#fefefe
| 571296 ||  || — || March 16, 2007 || Mount Lemmon || Mount Lemmon Survey ||  || align=right data-sort-value="0.54" | 540 m || 
|-id=297 bgcolor=#C2FFFF
| 571297 ||  || — || December 3, 2015 || Mount Lemmon || Mount Lemmon Survey || L5 || align=right | 6.8 km || 
|-id=298 bgcolor=#E9E9E9
| 571298 ||  || — || March 17, 2007 || Kitt Peak || Spacewatch ||  || align=right | 1.3 km || 
|-id=299 bgcolor=#E9E9E9
| 571299 ||  || — || March 16, 2007 || Mount Lemmon || Mount Lemmon Survey ||  || align=right | 1.1 km || 
|-id=300 bgcolor=#E9E9E9
| 571300 ||  || — || March 25, 2007 || Mount Lemmon || Mount Lemmon Survey ||  || align=right | 1.3 km || 
|}

571301–571400 

|-bgcolor=#d6d6d6
| 571301 ||  || — || April 12, 2007 || Altschwendt || W. Ries ||  || align=right | 3.5 km || 
|-id=302 bgcolor=#d6d6d6
| 571302 ||  || — || March 16, 2007 || Kitt Peak || Spacewatch ||  || align=right | 2.9 km || 
|-id=303 bgcolor=#E9E9E9
| 571303 ||  || — || December 2, 2005 || Kitt Peak || Spacewatch ||  || align=right | 1.5 km || 
|-id=304 bgcolor=#fefefe
| 571304 ||  || — || March 14, 2007 || Kitt Peak || Spacewatch ||  || align=right data-sort-value="0.57" | 570 m || 
|-id=305 bgcolor=#E9E9E9
| 571305 ||  || — || April 11, 2007 || Kitt Peak || Spacewatch ||  || align=right | 1.9 km || 
|-id=306 bgcolor=#fefefe
| 571306 ||  || — || April 14, 2007 || Mount Lemmon || Mount Lemmon Survey ||  || align=right data-sort-value="0.78" | 780 m || 
|-id=307 bgcolor=#E9E9E9
| 571307 ||  || — || April 14, 2007 || Kitt Peak || Spacewatch ||  || align=right data-sort-value="0.84" | 840 m || 
|-id=308 bgcolor=#d6d6d6
| 571308 ||  || — || April 14, 2007 || Kitt Peak || Spacewatch ||  || align=right | 3.4 km || 
|-id=309 bgcolor=#E9E9E9
| 571309 ||  || — || October 13, 2004 || Kitt Peak || Spacewatch ||  || align=right | 1.4 km || 
|-id=310 bgcolor=#fefefe
| 571310 ||  || — || January 29, 2003 || Kitt Peak || Spacewatch ||  || align=right data-sort-value="0.78" | 780 m || 
|-id=311 bgcolor=#E9E9E9
| 571311 ||  || — || October 2, 2000 || Kitt Peak || Spacewatch ||  || align=right | 1.4 km || 
|-id=312 bgcolor=#fefefe
| 571312 ||  || — || April 15, 2007 || Kitt Peak || Spacewatch ||  || align=right data-sort-value="0.53" | 530 m || 
|-id=313 bgcolor=#E9E9E9
| 571313 ||  || — || April 12, 2007 || Lulin || LUSS ||  || align=right | 2.0 km || 
|-id=314 bgcolor=#fefefe
| 571314 ||  || — || April 29, 2014 || Haleakala || Pan-STARRS ||  || align=right data-sort-value="0.58" | 580 m || 
|-id=315 bgcolor=#E9E9E9
| 571315 ||  || — || September 14, 2013 || Haleakala || Pan-STARRS ||  || align=right | 1.2 km || 
|-id=316 bgcolor=#d6d6d6
| 571316 ||  || — || November 28, 2011 || Haleakala || Pan-STARRS ||  || align=right | 2.6 km || 
|-id=317 bgcolor=#E9E9E9
| 571317 ||  || — || April 14, 2016 || Mount Lemmon || Mount Lemmon Survey ||  || align=right | 1.4 km || 
|-id=318 bgcolor=#d6d6d6
| 571318 ||  || — || November 14, 2010 || Mount Lemmon || Mount Lemmon Survey ||  || align=right | 2.9 km || 
|-id=319 bgcolor=#E9E9E9
| 571319 ||  || — || April 15, 2007 || Kitt Peak || Spacewatch ||  || align=right | 1.2 km || 
|-id=320 bgcolor=#E9E9E9
| 571320 ||  || — || April 15, 2007 || Kitt Peak || Spacewatch ||  || align=right | 1.3 km || 
|-id=321 bgcolor=#E9E9E9
| 571321 ||  || — || March 31, 2007 || Palomar || NEAT ||  || align=right | 2.3 km || 
|-id=322 bgcolor=#fefefe
| 571322 ||  || — || April 18, 2007 || Mount Lemmon || Mount Lemmon Survey ||  || align=right data-sort-value="0.54" | 540 m || 
|-id=323 bgcolor=#FA8072
| 571323 ||  || — || April 18, 2007 || Kitt Peak || Spacewatch ||  || align=right data-sort-value="0.62" | 620 m || 
|-id=324 bgcolor=#E9E9E9
| 571324 ||  || — || April 18, 2007 || Mount Lemmon || Mount Lemmon Survey ||  || align=right | 1.5 km || 
|-id=325 bgcolor=#fefefe
| 571325 ||  || — || March 26, 2007 || Kitt Peak || Spacewatch ||  || align=right data-sort-value="0.71" | 710 m || 
|-id=326 bgcolor=#E9E9E9
| 571326 ||  || — || March 11, 2007 || Mount Lemmon || Mount Lemmon Survey ||  || align=right | 1.9 km || 
|-id=327 bgcolor=#FA8072
| 571327 ||  || — || March 20, 2007 || Kitt Peak || Spacewatch ||  || align=right data-sort-value="0.61" | 610 m || 
|-id=328 bgcolor=#E9E9E9
| 571328 ||  || — || April 19, 2007 || Kitt Peak || Spacewatch ||  || align=right | 1.4 km || 
|-id=329 bgcolor=#E9E9E9
| 571329 ||  || — || April 19, 2007 || Kitt Peak || Spacewatch ||  || align=right data-sort-value="0.57" | 570 m || 
|-id=330 bgcolor=#E9E9E9
| 571330 ||  || — || March 14, 2007 || Mount Lemmon || Mount Lemmon Survey ||  || align=right | 1.7 km || 
|-id=331 bgcolor=#fefefe
| 571331 ||  || — || March 31, 2007 || Palomar || NEAT ||  || align=right data-sort-value="0.89" | 890 m || 
|-id=332 bgcolor=#fefefe
| 571332 ||  || — || March 15, 2007 || Mount Lemmon || Mount Lemmon Survey ||  || align=right data-sort-value="0.62" | 620 m || 
|-id=333 bgcolor=#E9E9E9
| 571333 ||  || — || April 18, 2007 || Mount Lemmon || Mount Lemmon Survey ||  || align=right | 1.4 km || 
|-id=334 bgcolor=#E9E9E9
| 571334 ||  || — || May 1, 2003 || Kitt Peak || Spacewatch ||  || align=right | 1.5 km || 
|-id=335 bgcolor=#E9E9E9
| 571335 ||  || — || April 22, 2007 || Kitt Peak || Spacewatch ||  || align=right | 1.5 km || 
|-id=336 bgcolor=#fefefe
| 571336 ||  || — || April 22, 2007 || Kitt Peak || Spacewatch ||  || align=right data-sort-value="0.82" | 820 m || 
|-id=337 bgcolor=#E9E9E9
| 571337 ||  || — || March 26, 2007 || Mount Lemmon || Mount Lemmon Survey ||  || align=right | 1.9 km || 
|-id=338 bgcolor=#d6d6d6
| 571338 ||  || — || April 22, 2007 || Mount Lemmon || Mount Lemmon Survey ||  || align=right | 2.6 km || 
|-id=339 bgcolor=#E9E9E9
| 571339 ||  || — || April 11, 2007 || Mount Lemmon || Mount Lemmon Survey ||  || align=right | 1.4 km || 
|-id=340 bgcolor=#E9E9E9
| 571340 ||  || — || March 14, 2007 || Mount Lemmon || Mount Lemmon Survey ||  || align=right | 1.3 km || 
|-id=341 bgcolor=#E9E9E9
| 571341 ||  || — || April 23, 2007 || Mount Lemmon || Mount Lemmon Survey ||  || align=right | 1.3 km || 
|-id=342 bgcolor=#E9E9E9
| 571342 ||  || — || October 9, 2004 || Kitt Peak || Spacewatch ||  || align=right | 1.5 km || 
|-id=343 bgcolor=#E9E9E9
| 571343 ||  || — || April 23, 2007 || Kitt Peak || Spacewatch ||  || align=right | 1.5 km || 
|-id=344 bgcolor=#d6d6d6
| 571344 ||  || — || April 22, 2007 || Kitt Peak || Spacewatch ||  || align=right | 2.9 km || 
|-id=345 bgcolor=#E9E9E9
| 571345 ||  || — || March 14, 2007 || Mount Lemmon || Mount Lemmon Survey ||  || align=right | 1.4 km || 
|-id=346 bgcolor=#E9E9E9
| 571346 ||  || — || March 12, 2007 || Catalina || CSS ||  || align=right | 1.3 km || 
|-id=347 bgcolor=#E9E9E9
| 571347 ||  || — || April 16, 2007 || Mount Lemmon || Mount Lemmon Survey ||  || align=right | 1.7 km || 
|-id=348 bgcolor=#E9E9E9
| 571348 ||  || — || March 13, 2007 || Mount Lemmon || Mount Lemmon Survey ||  || align=right | 1.7 km || 
|-id=349 bgcolor=#E9E9E9
| 571349 ||  || — || April 21, 2007 || Cerro Tololo || L. H. Wasserman ||  || align=right data-sort-value="0.63" | 630 m || 
|-id=350 bgcolor=#E9E9E9
| 571350 ||  || — || April 22, 2007 || Mount Lemmon || Mount Lemmon Survey ||  || align=right | 1.7 km || 
|-id=351 bgcolor=#fefefe
| 571351 ||  || — || April 25, 2007 || Kitt Peak || Spacewatch ||  || align=right data-sort-value="0.65" | 650 m || 
|-id=352 bgcolor=#E9E9E9
| 571352 ||  || — || April 22, 2007 || Kitt Peak || Spacewatch ||  || align=right | 1.5 km || 
|-id=353 bgcolor=#E9E9E9
| 571353 ||  || — || April 24, 2007 || Kitt Peak || Spacewatch ||  || align=right | 1.4 km || 
|-id=354 bgcolor=#d6d6d6
| 571354 ||  || — || September 18, 2010 || Mount Lemmon || Mount Lemmon Survey ||  || align=right | 3.0 km || 
|-id=355 bgcolor=#E9E9E9
| 571355 ||  || — || November 2, 2013 || Mount Lemmon || Mount Lemmon Survey ||  || align=right | 1.8 km || 
|-id=356 bgcolor=#fefefe
| 571356 ||  || — || April 18, 2007 || Kitt Peak || Spacewatch ||  || align=right data-sort-value="0.65" | 650 m || 
|-id=357 bgcolor=#E9E9E9
| 571357 ||  || — || November 16, 2009 || Kitt Peak || Spacewatch ||  || align=right | 1.6 km || 
|-id=358 bgcolor=#E9E9E9
| 571358 ||  || — || April 20, 2007 || Mount Lemmon || Mount Lemmon Survey ||  || align=right | 2.0 km || 
|-id=359 bgcolor=#E9E9E9
| 571359 ||  || — || April 22, 2007 || Kitt Peak || Spacewatch ||  || align=right | 1.2 km || 
|-id=360 bgcolor=#E9E9E9
| 571360 ||  || — || April 18, 2007 || Kitt Peak || Spacewatch ||  || align=right data-sort-value="0.69" | 690 m || 
|-id=361 bgcolor=#fefefe
| 571361 ||  || — || April 22, 2007 || Mount Lemmon || Mount Lemmon Survey ||  || align=right data-sort-value="0.58" | 580 m || 
|-id=362 bgcolor=#E9E9E9
| 571362 ||  || — || May 7, 2007 || Kitt Peak || Spacewatch ||  || align=right | 1.8 km || 
|-id=363 bgcolor=#fefefe
| 571363 ||  || — || April 25, 2007 || Kitt Peak || Spacewatch ||  || align=right data-sort-value="0.67" | 670 m || 
|-id=364 bgcolor=#E9E9E9
| 571364 ||  || — || April 11, 2007 || Mount Lemmon || Mount Lemmon Survey ||  || align=right | 1.6 km || 
|-id=365 bgcolor=#fefefe
| 571365 ||  || — || May 9, 2007 || Kitt Peak || Spacewatch ||  || align=right data-sort-value="0.76" | 760 m || 
|-id=366 bgcolor=#fefefe
| 571366 ||  || — || April 24, 2007 || Kitt Peak || Spacewatch ||  || align=right data-sort-value="0.56" | 560 m || 
|-id=367 bgcolor=#E9E9E9
| 571367 ||  || — || May 12, 2007 || Mount Lemmon || Mount Lemmon Survey ||  || align=right | 1.5 km || 
|-id=368 bgcolor=#fefefe
| 571368 ||  || — || March 13, 2007 || Mount Lemmon || Mount Lemmon Survey ||  || align=right data-sort-value="0.63" | 630 m || 
|-id=369 bgcolor=#d6d6d6
| 571369 ||  || — || May 10, 2007 || Kitt Peak || Spacewatch ||  || align=right | 3.1 km || 
|-id=370 bgcolor=#fefefe
| 571370 ||  || — || April 18, 2007 || Mount Lemmon || Mount Lemmon Survey ||  || align=right data-sort-value="0.51" | 510 m || 
|-id=371 bgcolor=#E9E9E9
| 571371 ||  || — || January 7, 2006 || Mount Lemmon || Mount Lemmon Survey ||  || align=right data-sort-value="0.81" | 810 m || 
|-id=372 bgcolor=#fefefe
| 571372 ||  || — || April 28, 2007 || Kitt Peak || Spacewatch ||  || align=right data-sort-value="0.69" | 690 m || 
|-id=373 bgcolor=#E9E9E9
| 571373 ||  || — || May 14, 2007 || Siding Spring || SSS ||  || align=right | 2.9 km || 
|-id=374 bgcolor=#d6d6d6
| 571374 ||  || — || May 10, 2007 || Mount Lemmon || Mount Lemmon Survey ||  || align=right | 2.9 km || 
|-id=375 bgcolor=#E9E9E9
| 571375 ||  || — || September 7, 2008 || Mount Lemmon || Mount Lemmon Survey ||  || align=right | 1.4 km || 
|-id=376 bgcolor=#E9E9E9
| 571376 ||  || — || March 2, 2011 || Kitt Peak || Spacewatch ||  || align=right | 1.4 km || 
|-id=377 bgcolor=#E9E9E9
| 571377 ||  || — || March 4, 2016 || Haleakala || Pan-STARRS ||  || align=right | 1.8 km || 
|-id=378 bgcolor=#E9E9E9
| 571378 ||  || — || February 26, 2011 || Catalina || CSS ||  || align=right | 1.8 km || 
|-id=379 bgcolor=#fefefe
| 571379 ||  || — || September 8, 2011 || Kitt Peak || Spacewatch ||  || align=right data-sort-value="0.56" | 560 m || 
|-id=380 bgcolor=#E9E9E9
| 571380 ||  || — || September 6, 2013 || Mount Lemmon || Mount Lemmon Survey ||  || align=right | 1.4 km || 
|-id=381 bgcolor=#E9E9E9
| 571381 ||  || — || January 23, 2015 || Haleakala || Pan-STARRS ||  || align=right | 1.1 km || 
|-id=382 bgcolor=#E9E9E9
| 571382 ||  || — || May 12, 2007 || Kitt Peak || Spacewatch ||  || align=right | 1.6 km || 
|-id=383 bgcolor=#d6d6d6
| 571383 ||  || — || May 16, 2007 || Mount Lemmon || Mount Lemmon Survey ||  || align=right | 2.5 km || 
|-id=384 bgcolor=#E9E9E9
| 571384 ||  || — || May 16, 2007 || Mount Lemmon || Mount Lemmon Survey ||  || align=right | 1.8 km || 
|-id=385 bgcolor=#FA8072
| 571385 ||  || — || May 18, 2007 || Mount Lemmon || Mount Lemmon Survey ||  || align=right data-sort-value="0.47" | 470 m || 
|-id=386 bgcolor=#E9E9E9
| 571386 ||  || — || December 24, 2005 || Kitt Peak || Spacewatch ||  || align=right | 1.6 km || 
|-id=387 bgcolor=#fefefe
| 571387 ||  || — || May 11, 2007 || Mount Lemmon || Mount Lemmon Survey ||  || align=right data-sort-value="0.55" | 550 m || 
|-id=388 bgcolor=#E9E9E9
| 571388 ||  || — || May 26, 2007 || Mount Lemmon || Mount Lemmon Survey ||  || align=right | 1.7 km || 
|-id=389 bgcolor=#E9E9E9
| 571389 ||  || — || September 4, 2008 || Kitt Peak || Spacewatch ||  || align=right | 1.4 km || 
|-id=390 bgcolor=#fefefe
| 571390 ||  || — || May 25, 2007 || Mount Lemmon || Mount Lemmon Survey ||  || align=right data-sort-value="0.62" | 620 m || 
|-id=391 bgcolor=#E9E9E9
| 571391 ||  || — || May 16, 2007 || Kitt Peak || Spacewatch ||  || align=right | 1.3 km || 
|-id=392 bgcolor=#E9E9E9
| 571392 ||  || — || June 8, 2007 || Kitt Peak || Spacewatch ||  || align=right | 1.8 km || 
|-id=393 bgcolor=#d6d6d6
| 571393 ||  || — || June 8, 2007 || Kitt Peak || Spacewatch ||  || align=right | 2.1 km || 
|-id=394 bgcolor=#E9E9E9
| 571394 ||  || — || May 12, 2007 || Mount Lemmon || Mount Lemmon Survey ||  || align=right | 1.7 km || 
|-id=395 bgcolor=#E9E9E9
| 571395 ||  || — || May 12, 2007 || Mount Lemmon || Mount Lemmon Survey ||  || align=right | 1.6 km || 
|-id=396 bgcolor=#E9E9E9
| 571396 ||  || — || June 10, 2007 || Kitt Peak || Spacewatch ||  || align=right | 1.7 km || 
|-id=397 bgcolor=#E9E9E9
| 571397 ||  || — || June 13, 2007 || Kitt Peak || Spacewatch ||  || align=right | 1.8 km || 
|-id=398 bgcolor=#E9E9E9
| 571398 ||  || — || June 11, 2007 || Mauna Kea || Mauna Kea Obs. ||  || align=right | 1.5 km || 
|-id=399 bgcolor=#E9E9E9
| 571399 ||  || — || September 28, 2003 || Kitt Peak || Spacewatch ||  || align=right | 1.7 km || 
|-id=400 bgcolor=#d6d6d6
| 571400 ||  || — || June 8, 2007 || Kitt Peak || Spacewatch ||  || align=right | 3.1 km || 
|}

571401–571500 

|-bgcolor=#E9E9E9
| 571401 ||  || — || June 9, 2007 || Kitt Peak || Spacewatch ||  || align=right | 1.5 km || 
|-id=402 bgcolor=#fefefe
| 571402 ||  || — || March 13, 2010 || Mount Lemmon || Mount Lemmon Survey ||  || align=right data-sort-value="0.74" | 740 m || 
|-id=403 bgcolor=#E9E9E9
| 571403 ||  || — || February 27, 2015 || Mount Lemmon || Mount Lemmon Survey ||  || align=right | 1.5 km || 
|-id=404 bgcolor=#E9E9E9
| 571404 ||  || — || May 9, 2007 || Kitt Peak || Spacewatch ||  || align=right | 1.6 km || 
|-id=405 bgcolor=#E9E9E9
| 571405 ||  || — || June 9, 2007 || Kitt Peak || Spacewatch ||  || align=right | 1.1 km || 
|-id=406 bgcolor=#E9E9E9
| 571406 ||  || — || June 21, 2007 || Mount Lemmon || Mount Lemmon Survey ||  || align=right | 2.0 km || 
|-id=407 bgcolor=#d6d6d6
| 571407 ||  || — || June 21, 2007 || Mount Lemmon || Mount Lemmon Survey ||  || align=right | 2.4 km || 
|-id=408 bgcolor=#E9E9E9
| 571408 ||  || — || June 20, 2007 || Kitt Peak || Spacewatch ||  || align=right | 1.8 km || 
|-id=409 bgcolor=#E9E9E9
| 571409 ||  || — || June 21, 2007 || Mount Lemmon || Mount Lemmon Survey ||  || align=right data-sort-value="0.94" | 940 m || 
|-id=410 bgcolor=#E9E9E9
| 571410 ||  || — || September 18, 2003 || Kitt Peak || Spacewatch ||  || align=right | 2.6 km || 
|-id=411 bgcolor=#E9E9E9
| 571411 ||  || — || June 22, 2007 || Kitt Peak || Spacewatch ||  || align=right | 1.8 km || 
|-id=412 bgcolor=#E9E9E9
| 571412 ||  || — || January 18, 2015 || Haleakala || Pan-STARRS ||  || align=right | 2.9 km || 
|-id=413 bgcolor=#fefefe
| 571413 ||  || — || October 26, 2011 || Haleakala || Pan-STARRS ||  || align=right data-sort-value="0.57" | 570 m || 
|-id=414 bgcolor=#E9E9E9
| 571414 ||  || — || June 16, 2007 || Kitt Peak || Spacewatch ||  || align=right | 1.8 km || 
|-id=415 bgcolor=#E9E9E9
| 571415 ||  || — || January 17, 2015 || Haleakala || Pan-STARRS ||  || align=right | 1.8 km || 
|-id=416 bgcolor=#E9E9E9
| 571416 ||  || — || February 5, 2016 || Haleakala || Pan-STARRS ||  || align=right | 2.2 km || 
|-id=417 bgcolor=#E9E9E9
| 571417 ||  || — || September 27, 2016 || Haleakala || Pan-STARRS ||  || align=right data-sort-value="0.82" | 820 m || 
|-id=418 bgcolor=#fefefe
| 571418 ||  || — || January 7, 2017 || Mount Lemmon || Mount Lemmon Survey || H || align=right data-sort-value="0.54" | 540 m || 
|-id=419 bgcolor=#E9E9E9
| 571419 ||  || — || February 11, 2014 || Mount Lemmon || Mount Lemmon Survey ||  || align=right | 1.2 km || 
|-id=420 bgcolor=#fefefe
| 571420 ||  || — || October 29, 2008 || Kitt Peak || Spacewatch ||  || align=right data-sort-value="0.73" | 730 m || 
|-id=421 bgcolor=#fefefe
| 571421 ||  || — || July 4, 2017 || Haleakala || Pan-STARRS ||  || align=right data-sort-value="0.54" | 540 m || 
|-id=422 bgcolor=#E9E9E9
| 571422 ||  || — || August 7, 2007 || Siding Spring || SSS ||  || align=right | 2.5 km || 
|-id=423 bgcolor=#fefefe
| 571423 ||  || — || June 14, 2007 || Kitt Peak || Spacewatch ||  || align=right data-sort-value="0.90" | 900 m || 
|-id=424 bgcolor=#E9E9E9
| 571424 ||  || — || August 12, 2007 || Pla D'Arguines || R. Ferrando, M. Ferrando ||  || align=right | 2.0 km || 
|-id=425 bgcolor=#E9E9E9
| 571425 ||  || — || July 7, 2007 || Lulin || LUSS ||  || align=right | 3.1 km || 
|-id=426 bgcolor=#E9E9E9
| 571426 ||  || — || March 16, 2005 || Mount Lemmon || Mount Lemmon Survey ||  || align=right | 1.6 km || 
|-id=427 bgcolor=#E9E9E9
| 571427 ||  || — || August 10, 2007 || Kitt Peak || Spacewatch ||  || align=right | 1.6 km || 
|-id=428 bgcolor=#E9E9E9
| 571428 ||  || — || June 24, 2011 || Mount Lemmon || Mount Lemmon Survey ||  || align=right data-sort-value="0.94" | 940 m || 
|-id=429 bgcolor=#d6d6d6
| 571429 ||  || — || August 10, 2007 || Kitt Peak || Spacewatch ||  || align=right | 1.9 km || 
|-id=430 bgcolor=#E9E9E9
| 571430 ||  || — || August 20, 2007 || Bisei SG Center || S. Okumura, T. Sakamoto ||  || align=right | 2.8 km || 
|-id=431 bgcolor=#E9E9E9
| 571431 ||  || — || August 20, 2007 || Pla D'Arguines || R. Ferrando, M. Ferrando ||  || align=right | 2.0 km || 
|-id=432 bgcolor=#d6d6d6
| 571432 ||  || — || October 16, 2012 || Mount Lemmon || Mount Lemmon Survey ||  || align=right | 2.9 km || 
|-id=433 bgcolor=#E9E9E9
| 571433 ||  || — || August 24, 2007 || Kitt Peak || Spacewatch ||  || align=right data-sort-value="0.65" | 650 m || 
|-id=434 bgcolor=#fefefe
| 571434 ||  || — || August 18, 2007 || Anderson Mesa || LONEOS ||  || align=right data-sort-value="0.70" | 700 m || 
|-id=435 bgcolor=#E9E9E9
| 571435 ||  || — || September 3, 2007 || Catalina || CSS ||  || align=right | 2.0 km || 
|-id=436 bgcolor=#E9E9E9
| 571436 ||  || — || February 9, 2005 || Mount Lemmon || Mount Lemmon Survey ||  || align=right | 2.9 km || 
|-id=437 bgcolor=#fefefe
| 571437 ||  || — || September 5, 2007 || Dauban || C. Rinner, F. Kugel ||  || align=right data-sort-value="0.89" | 890 m || 
|-id=438 bgcolor=#d6d6d6
| 571438 ||  || — || September 9, 2007 || Wildberg || R. Apitzsch || Tj (2.99) || align=right | 3.2 km || 
|-id=439 bgcolor=#fefefe
| 571439 ||  || — || February 24, 2006 || Catalina || CSS || H || align=right data-sort-value="0.79" | 790 m || 
|-id=440 bgcolor=#fefefe
| 571440 ||  || — || August 9, 2007 || Kitt Peak || Spacewatch ||  || align=right data-sort-value="0.82" | 820 m || 
|-id=441 bgcolor=#E9E9E9
| 571441 ||  || — || September 5, 2007 || Catalina || CSS ||  || align=right | 1.5 km || 
|-id=442 bgcolor=#fefefe
| 571442 ||  || — || September 9, 2007 || Kitt Peak || Spacewatch ||  || align=right data-sort-value="0.71" | 710 m || 
|-id=443 bgcolor=#d6d6d6
| 571443 ||  || — || September 9, 2007 || Kitt Peak || Spacewatch ||  || align=right | 2.7 km || 
|-id=444 bgcolor=#fefefe
| 571444 ||  || — || September 10, 2007 || Mount Lemmon || Mount Lemmon Survey ||  || align=right data-sort-value="0.66" | 660 m || 
|-id=445 bgcolor=#d6d6d6
| 571445 ||  || — || September 10, 2007 || Mount Lemmon || Mount Lemmon Survey ||  || align=right | 2.2 km || 
|-id=446 bgcolor=#E9E9E9
| 571446 ||  || — || September 10, 2007 || Mount Lemmon || Mount Lemmon Survey ||  || align=right | 1.6 km || 
|-id=447 bgcolor=#E9E9E9
| 571447 ||  || — || August 10, 2007 || Kitt Peak || Spacewatch ||  || align=right data-sort-value="0.90" | 900 m || 
|-id=448 bgcolor=#E9E9E9
| 571448 ||  || — || September 10, 2007 || Mount Lemmon || Mount Lemmon Survey ||  || align=right | 2.0 km || 
|-id=449 bgcolor=#d6d6d6
| 571449 ||  || — || September 10, 2007 || Mount Lemmon || Mount Lemmon Survey || 3:2 || align=right | 3.7 km || 
|-id=450 bgcolor=#fefefe
| 571450 ||  || — || September 10, 2007 || Mount Lemmon || Mount Lemmon Survey ||  || align=right data-sort-value="0.55" | 550 m || 
|-id=451 bgcolor=#d6d6d6
| 571451 ||  || — || September 10, 2007 || Mount Lemmon || Mount Lemmon Survey ||  || align=right | 1.6 km || 
|-id=452 bgcolor=#d6d6d6
| 571452 ||  || — || September 10, 2007 || Mount Lemmon || Mount Lemmon Survey ||  || align=right | 2.6 km || 
|-id=453 bgcolor=#fefefe
| 571453 ||  || — || September 10, 2007 || Kitt Peak || Spacewatch ||  || align=right data-sort-value="0.54" | 540 m || 
|-id=454 bgcolor=#E9E9E9
| 571454 ||  || — || September 10, 2007 || Kitt Peak || Spacewatch ||  || align=right | 1.9 km || 
|-id=455 bgcolor=#E9E9E9
| 571455 ||  || — || September 3, 2007 || Catalina || CSS ||  || align=right | 2.0 km || 
|-id=456 bgcolor=#d6d6d6
| 571456 ||  || — || September 11, 2007 || Kitt Peak || Spacewatch ||  || align=right | 2.3 km || 
|-id=457 bgcolor=#fefefe
| 571457 ||  || — || September 11, 2007 || XuYi || PMO NEO ||  || align=right data-sort-value="0.60" | 600 m || 
|-id=458 bgcolor=#E9E9E9
| 571458 ||  || — || November 21, 2003 || Kitt Peak || Spacewatch ||  || align=right | 1.5 km || 
|-id=459 bgcolor=#E9E9E9
| 571459 ||  || — || May 5, 2006 || Kitt Peak || Spacewatch ||  || align=right | 2.2 km || 
|-id=460 bgcolor=#fefefe
| 571460 ||  || — || September 12, 2007 || Kitt Peak || Spacewatch ||  || align=right data-sort-value="0.70" | 700 m || 
|-id=461 bgcolor=#E9E9E9
| 571461 ||  || — || September 10, 2007 || Kitt Peak || Spacewatch ||  || align=right | 2.3 km || 
|-id=462 bgcolor=#E9E9E9
| 571462 ||  || — || September 10, 2007 || Kitt Peak || Spacewatch ||  || align=right | 2.2 km || 
|-id=463 bgcolor=#E9E9E9
| 571463 ||  || — || May 21, 2006 || Kitt Peak || Spacewatch ||  || align=right | 1.7 km || 
|-id=464 bgcolor=#fefefe
| 571464 ||  || — || August 21, 2007 || Anderson Mesa || LONEOS ||  || align=right data-sort-value="0.64" | 640 m || 
|-id=465 bgcolor=#fefefe
| 571465 ||  || — || September 11, 2007 || Mount Lemmon || Mount Lemmon Survey ||  || align=right data-sort-value="0.55" | 550 m || 
|-id=466 bgcolor=#fefefe
| 571466 ||  || — || September 8, 1996 || Kitt Peak || Spacewatch ||  || align=right data-sort-value="0.67" | 670 m || 
|-id=467 bgcolor=#fefefe
| 571467 ||  || — || September 10, 2007 || Kitt Peak || Spacewatch ||  || align=right data-sort-value="0.65" | 650 m || 
|-id=468 bgcolor=#d6d6d6
| 571468 ||  || — || September 13, 2007 || Mount Lemmon || Mount Lemmon Survey ||  || align=right | 1.8 km || 
|-id=469 bgcolor=#d6d6d6
| 571469 ||  || — || September 13, 2007 || Mount Lemmon || Mount Lemmon Survey ||  || align=right | 2.0 km || 
|-id=470 bgcolor=#fefefe
| 571470 ||  || — || September 13, 2007 || Mount Lemmon || Mount Lemmon Survey ||  || align=right data-sort-value="0.82" | 820 m || 
|-id=471 bgcolor=#d6d6d6
| 571471 ||  || — || February 27, 2015 || Haleakala || Pan-STARRS ||  || align=right | 1.9 km || 
|-id=472 bgcolor=#fefefe
| 571472 ||  || — || August 24, 2007 || Kitt Peak || Spacewatch ||  || align=right data-sort-value="0.54" | 540 m || 
|-id=473 bgcolor=#fefefe
| 571473 ||  || — || September 11, 2007 || Kitt Peak || Spacewatch ||  || align=right data-sort-value="0.62" | 620 m || 
|-id=474 bgcolor=#fefefe
| 571474 ||  || — || September 10, 2007 || Kitt Peak || Spacewatch ||  || align=right data-sort-value="0.80" | 800 m || 
|-id=475 bgcolor=#fefefe
| 571475 ||  || — || November 3, 2000 || Kitt Peak || Spacewatch ||  || align=right data-sort-value="0.67" | 670 m || 
|-id=476 bgcolor=#E9E9E9
| 571476 ||  || — || September 22, 2003 || Kitt Peak || Spacewatch ||  || align=right | 1.2 km || 
|-id=477 bgcolor=#d6d6d6
| 571477 ||  || — || September 11, 2007 || Mount Lemmon || Mount Lemmon Survey ||  || align=right | 1.7 km || 
|-id=478 bgcolor=#d6d6d6
| 571478 ||  || — || September 12, 2007 || Mount Lemmon || Mount Lemmon Survey ||  || align=right | 1.6 km || 
|-id=479 bgcolor=#fefefe
| 571479 ||  || — || September 13, 2007 || Mount Lemmon || Mount Lemmon Survey ||  || align=right data-sort-value="0.62" | 620 m || 
|-id=480 bgcolor=#E9E9E9
| 571480 ||  || — || September 14, 2007 || Kitt Peak || Spacewatch ||  || align=right | 2.0 km || 
|-id=481 bgcolor=#E9E9E9
| 571481 ||  || — || September 14, 2007 || Kitt Peak || Spacewatch ||  || align=right | 1.7 km || 
|-id=482 bgcolor=#fefefe
| 571482 ||  || — || September 10, 2007 || Kitt Peak || Spacewatch ||  || align=right data-sort-value="0.58" | 580 m || 
|-id=483 bgcolor=#fefefe
| 571483 ||  || — || September 15, 2007 || Kitt Peak || Spacewatch ||  || align=right data-sort-value="0.61" | 610 m || 
|-id=484 bgcolor=#fefefe
| 571484 ||  || — || March 24, 2006 || Kitt Peak || Spacewatch ||  || align=right data-sort-value="0.69" | 690 m || 
|-id=485 bgcolor=#fefefe
| 571485 ||  || — || September 12, 2007 || Mount Lemmon || Mount Lemmon Survey ||  || align=right data-sort-value="0.55" | 550 m || 
|-id=486 bgcolor=#d6d6d6
| 571486 ||  || — || September 9, 2007 || Mount Lemmon || Mount Lemmon Survey ||  || align=right | 1.7 km || 
|-id=487 bgcolor=#fefefe
| 571487 ||  || — || September 12, 2007 || Mount Lemmon || Mount Lemmon Survey ||  || align=right data-sort-value="0.61" | 610 m || 
|-id=488 bgcolor=#fefefe
| 571488 ||  || — || September 10, 2007 || Mount Lemmon || Mount Lemmon Survey ||  || align=right data-sort-value="0.57" | 570 m || 
|-id=489 bgcolor=#fefefe
| 571489 ||  || — || September 12, 2007 || Catalina || CSS ||  || align=right data-sort-value="0.59" | 590 m || 
|-id=490 bgcolor=#fefefe
| 571490 ||  || — || September 13, 2007 || Mount Lemmon || Mount Lemmon Survey ||  || align=right data-sort-value="0.49" | 490 m || 
|-id=491 bgcolor=#d6d6d6
| 571491 ||  || — || September 13, 2007 || Mount Lemmon || Mount Lemmon Survey ||  || align=right | 2.9 km || 
|-id=492 bgcolor=#d6d6d6
| 571492 ||  || — || September 11, 2007 || Kitt Peak || Spacewatch ||  || align=right | 2.0 km || 
|-id=493 bgcolor=#d6d6d6
| 571493 ||  || — || September 10, 2007 || Kitt Peak || Spacewatch ||  || align=right | 1.7 km || 
|-id=494 bgcolor=#fefefe
| 571494 ||  || — || September 9, 2007 || Mount Lemmon || Mount Lemmon Survey ||  || align=right data-sort-value="0.58" | 580 m || 
|-id=495 bgcolor=#E9E9E9
| 571495 ||  || — || September 10, 2007 || Kitt Peak || Spacewatch ||  || align=right | 1.7 km || 
|-id=496 bgcolor=#d6d6d6
| 571496 ||  || — || September 12, 2007 || Mount Lemmon || Mount Lemmon Survey ||  || align=right | 1.9 km || 
|-id=497 bgcolor=#d6d6d6
| 571497 ||  || — || August 10, 2007 || Kitt Peak || Spacewatch ||  || align=right | 1.6 km || 
|-id=498 bgcolor=#E9E9E9
| 571498 ||  || — || September 24, 2012 || Mount Lemmon || Mount Lemmon Survey ||  || align=right | 1.6 km || 
|-id=499 bgcolor=#fefefe
| 571499 ||  || — || September 10, 2007 || Mount Lemmon || Mount Lemmon Survey ||  || align=right data-sort-value="0.52" | 520 m || 
|-id=500 bgcolor=#d6d6d6
| 571500 ||  || — || August 24, 2007 || Kitt Peak || Spacewatch ||  || align=right | 1.9 km || 
|}

571501–571600 

|-bgcolor=#d6d6d6
| 571501 ||  || — || September 13, 2007 || Mount Lemmon || Mount Lemmon Survey ||  || align=right | 2.2 km || 
|-id=502 bgcolor=#E9E9E9
| 571502 ||  || — || September 11, 2007 || Mount Lemmon || Mount Lemmon Survey ||  || align=right | 1.6 km || 
|-id=503 bgcolor=#fefefe
| 571503 ||  || — || September 14, 2007 || Mount Lemmon || Mount Lemmon Survey ||  || align=right data-sort-value="0.77" | 770 m || 
|-id=504 bgcolor=#d6d6d6
| 571504 ||  || — || September 5, 2007 || Catalina || CSS ||  || align=right | 3.2 km || 
|-id=505 bgcolor=#d6d6d6
| 571505 ||  || — || February 16, 2015 || Haleakala || Pan-STARRS ||  || align=right | 2.5 km || 
|-id=506 bgcolor=#E9E9E9
| 571506 ||  || — || July 1, 2011 || Kitt Peak || Spacewatch ||  || align=right | 1.2 km || 
|-id=507 bgcolor=#fefefe
| 571507 ||  || — || October 20, 2011 || Mount Lemmon || Mount Lemmon Survey ||  || align=right data-sort-value="0.65" | 650 m || 
|-id=508 bgcolor=#d6d6d6
| 571508 ||  || — || September 13, 2007 || Mount Lemmon || Mount Lemmon Survey ||  || align=right | 2.0 km || 
|-id=509 bgcolor=#E9E9E9
| 571509 ||  || — || October 9, 2016 || Haleakala || Pan-STARRS ||  || align=right | 1.1 km || 
|-id=510 bgcolor=#d6d6d6
| 571510 ||  || — || September 10, 2007 || Mount Lemmon || Mount Lemmon Survey ||  || align=right | 1.8 km || 
|-id=511 bgcolor=#d6d6d6
| 571511 ||  || — || March 24, 2015 || Mount Lemmon || Mount Lemmon Survey ||  || align=right | 2.0 km || 
|-id=512 bgcolor=#d6d6d6
| 571512 ||  || — || September 15, 2007 || Mount Lemmon || Mount Lemmon Survey ||  || align=right | 2.1 km || 
|-id=513 bgcolor=#d6d6d6
| 571513 ||  || — || September 13, 2007 || Kitt Peak || Spacewatch ||  || align=right | 2.2 km || 
|-id=514 bgcolor=#fefefe
| 571514 ||  || — || June 2, 2014 || Haleakala || Pan-STARRS ||  || align=right data-sort-value="0.61" | 610 m || 
|-id=515 bgcolor=#fefefe
| 571515 ||  || — || September 4, 2007 || Catalina || CSS ||  || align=right data-sort-value="0.75" | 750 m || 
|-id=516 bgcolor=#d6d6d6
| 571516 ||  || — || September 13, 2007 || Mount Lemmon || Mount Lemmon Survey ||  || align=right | 2.1 km || 
|-id=517 bgcolor=#d6d6d6
| 571517 ||  || — || September 14, 2007 || Mount Lemmon || Mount Lemmon Survey ||  || align=right | 1.5 km || 
|-id=518 bgcolor=#d6d6d6
| 571518 ||  || — || September 14, 2007 || Mount Lemmon || Mount Lemmon Survey ||  || align=right | 1.6 km || 
|-id=519 bgcolor=#d6d6d6
| 571519 ||  || — || September 14, 2007 || Mount Lemmon || Mount Lemmon Survey ||  || align=right | 2.5 km || 
|-id=520 bgcolor=#d6d6d6
| 571520 ||  || — || September 4, 2007 || Mount Lemmon || Mount Lemmon Survey ||  || align=right | 1.5 km || 
|-id=521 bgcolor=#d6d6d6
| 571521 ||  || — || September 12, 2007 || Mount Lemmon || Mount Lemmon Survey ||  || align=right | 1.8 km || 
|-id=522 bgcolor=#fefefe
| 571522 ||  || — || September 9, 2007 || Mount Lemmon || Mount Lemmon Survey ||  || align=right data-sort-value="0.47" | 470 m || 
|-id=523 bgcolor=#E9E9E9
| 571523 ||  || — || September 14, 2007 || Mount Lemmon || Mount Lemmon Survey ||  || align=right | 1.7 km || 
|-id=524 bgcolor=#d6d6d6
| 571524 ||  || — || September 4, 2007 || Mount Lemmon || Mount Lemmon Survey ||  || align=right | 2.3 km || 
|-id=525 bgcolor=#fefefe
| 571525 ||  || — || July 18, 2007 || Mount Lemmon || Mount Lemmon Survey || V || align=right data-sort-value="0.68" | 680 m || 
|-id=526 bgcolor=#fefefe
| 571526 ||  || — || September 26, 2007 || Mount Lemmon || Mount Lemmon Survey || NYS || align=right data-sort-value="0.54" | 540 m || 
|-id=527 bgcolor=#fefefe
| 571527 ||  || — || September 12, 2007 || Catalina || CSS ||  || align=right data-sort-value="0.98" | 980 m || 
|-id=528 bgcolor=#d6d6d6
| 571528 ||  || — || September 25, 2007 || Mount Lemmon || Mount Lemmon Survey ||  || align=right | 2.9 km || 
|-id=529 bgcolor=#d6d6d6
| 571529 ||  || — || September 23, 2017 || Haleakala || Pan-STARRS ||  || align=right | 1.6 km || 
|-id=530 bgcolor=#E9E9E9
| 571530 ||  || — || September 25, 2007 || Mount Lemmon || Mount Lemmon Survey ||  || align=right | 1.3 km || 
|-id=531 bgcolor=#fefefe
| 571531 ||  || — || September 19, 2007 || Kitt Peak || Spacewatch ||  || align=right data-sort-value="0.58" | 580 m || 
|-id=532 bgcolor=#fefefe
| 571532 ||  || — || October 7, 2007 || Dauban || F. Kugel ||  || align=right data-sort-value="0.83" | 830 m || 
|-id=533 bgcolor=#fefefe
| 571533 ||  || — || October 7, 2007 || Pla D'Arguines || R. Ferrando, M. Ferrando ||  || align=right data-sort-value="0.73" | 730 m || 
|-id=534 bgcolor=#fefefe
| 571534 ||  || — || October 8, 2007 || Catalina || CSS ||  || align=right data-sort-value="0.89" | 890 m || 
|-id=535 bgcolor=#fefefe
| 571535 ||  || — || October 2, 2007 || Charleston || R. Holmes ||  || align=right data-sort-value="0.94" | 940 m || 
|-id=536 bgcolor=#d6d6d6
| 571536 ||  || — || October 4, 2007 || Kitt Peak || Spacewatch ||  || align=right | 2.5 km || 
|-id=537 bgcolor=#E9E9E9
| 571537 ||  || — || October 6, 2007 || Kitt Peak || Spacewatch ||  || align=right | 2.2 km || 
|-id=538 bgcolor=#E9E9E9
| 571538 ||  || — || September 10, 2007 || Kitt Peak || Spacewatch ||  || align=right | 1.8 km || 
|-id=539 bgcolor=#fefefe
| 571539 ||  || — || September 10, 2007 || Mount Lemmon || Mount Lemmon Survey ||  || align=right data-sort-value="0.94" | 940 m || 
|-id=540 bgcolor=#fefefe
| 571540 ||  || — || October 4, 2007 || Kitt Peak || Spacewatch ||  || align=right data-sort-value="0.56" | 560 m || 
|-id=541 bgcolor=#d6d6d6
| 571541 ||  || — || October 4, 2007 || Kitt Peak || Spacewatch ||  || align=right | 3.2 km || 
|-id=542 bgcolor=#d6d6d6
| 571542 ||  || — || October 4, 2007 || Kitt Peak || Spacewatch ||  || align=right | 2.2 km || 
|-id=543 bgcolor=#d6d6d6
| 571543 ||  || — || September 15, 2007 || Kitt Peak || Spacewatch ||  || align=right | 2.7 km || 
|-id=544 bgcolor=#E9E9E9
| 571544 ||  || — || September 9, 2007 || Mount Lemmon || Mount Lemmon Survey ||  || align=right | 1.9 km || 
|-id=545 bgcolor=#fefefe
| 571545 ||  || — || October 7, 2007 || Mount Lemmon || Mount Lemmon Survey ||  || align=right data-sort-value="0.70" | 700 m || 
|-id=546 bgcolor=#fefefe
| 571546 ||  || — || October 8, 2007 || Catalina || CSS ||  || align=right data-sort-value="0.71" | 710 m || 
|-id=547 bgcolor=#fefefe
| 571547 ||  || — || October 7, 2007 || Mount Lemmon || Mount Lemmon Survey ||  || align=right data-sort-value="0.47" | 470 m || 
|-id=548 bgcolor=#fefefe
| 571548 ||  || — || September 27, 2003 || Kitt Peak || Spacewatch || V || align=right data-sort-value="0.51" | 510 m || 
|-id=549 bgcolor=#fefefe
| 571549 ||  || — || October 8, 2007 || Mount Lemmon || Mount Lemmon Survey ||  || align=right data-sort-value="0.53" | 530 m || 
|-id=550 bgcolor=#fefefe
| 571550 ||  || — || October 6, 2000 || Anderson Mesa || LONEOS ||  || align=right data-sort-value="0.76" | 760 m || 
|-id=551 bgcolor=#d6d6d6
| 571551 ||  || — || October 8, 2007 || Mount Lemmon || Mount Lemmon Survey ||  || align=right | 2.2 km || 
|-id=552 bgcolor=#fefefe
| 571552 ||  || — || September 11, 2007 || Mount Lemmon || Mount Lemmon Survey || V || align=right data-sort-value="0.45" | 450 m || 
|-id=553 bgcolor=#fefefe
| 571553 ||  || — || September 20, 2007 || Catalina || CSS ||  || align=right data-sort-value="0.93" | 930 m || 
|-id=554 bgcolor=#fefefe
| 571554 ||  || — || October 6, 2007 || Kitt Peak || Spacewatch ||  || align=right data-sort-value="0.90" | 900 m || 
|-id=555 bgcolor=#fefefe
| 571555 ||  || — || July 5, 2003 || Kitt Peak || Spacewatch ||  || align=right | 1.1 km || 
|-id=556 bgcolor=#fefefe
| 571556 ||  || — || September 11, 2007 || Mount Lemmon || Mount Lemmon Survey ||  || align=right data-sort-value="0.81" | 810 m || 
|-id=557 bgcolor=#fefefe
| 571557 ||  || — || October 11, 2007 || Kitt Peak || Spacewatch ||  || align=right data-sort-value="0.70" | 700 m || 
|-id=558 bgcolor=#fefefe
| 571558 ||  || — || October 8, 2007 || Crni Vrh || S. Matičič ||  || align=right data-sort-value="0.84" | 840 m || 
|-id=559 bgcolor=#fefefe
| 571559 ||  || — || May 2, 2003 || Kitt Peak || Spacewatch ||  || align=right data-sort-value="0.66" | 660 m || 
|-id=560 bgcolor=#fefefe
| 571560 ||  || — || October 8, 2007 || Anderson Mesa || LONEOS ||  || align=right data-sort-value="0.89" | 890 m || 
|-id=561 bgcolor=#fefefe
| 571561 ||  || — || October 15, 2007 || Lulin || LUSS ||  || align=right data-sort-value="0.92" | 920 m || 
|-id=562 bgcolor=#d6d6d6
| 571562 ||  || — || September 12, 2007 || Mount Lemmon || Mount Lemmon Survey ||  || align=right | 1.8 km || 
|-id=563 bgcolor=#fefefe
| 571563 ||  || — || October 8, 2007 || Kitt Peak || Spacewatch ||  || align=right data-sort-value="0.68" | 680 m || 
|-id=564 bgcolor=#fefefe
| 571564 ||  || — || October 8, 2007 || Mount Lemmon || Mount Lemmon Survey ||  || align=right data-sort-value="0.68" | 680 m || 
|-id=565 bgcolor=#fefefe
| 571565 ||  || — || October 11, 2007 || Mount Lemmon || Mount Lemmon Survey ||  || align=right data-sort-value="0.62" | 620 m || 
|-id=566 bgcolor=#fefefe
| 571566 ||  || — || October 10, 2007 || Mount Lemmon || Mount Lemmon Survey ||  || align=right data-sort-value="0.75" | 750 m || 
|-id=567 bgcolor=#fefefe
| 571567 ||  || — || October 5, 2007 || Kitt Peak || Spacewatch ||  || align=right data-sort-value="0.78" | 780 m || 
|-id=568 bgcolor=#d6d6d6
| 571568 ||  || — || October 7, 2007 || Kitt Peak || Spacewatch ||  || align=right | 3.2 km || 
|-id=569 bgcolor=#E9E9E9
| 571569 ||  || — || October 8, 2007 || Mount Lemmon || Mount Lemmon Survey ||  || align=right | 2.2 km || 
|-id=570 bgcolor=#E9E9E9
| 571570 ||  || — || October 8, 2007 || Mount Lemmon || Mount Lemmon Survey ||  || align=right | 1.8 km || 
|-id=571 bgcolor=#d6d6d6
| 571571 ||  || — || September 12, 2007 || Mount Lemmon || Mount Lemmon Survey ||  || align=right | 1.9 km || 
|-id=572 bgcolor=#E9E9E9
| 571572 ||  || — || October 8, 2007 || Kitt Peak || Spacewatch ||  || align=right | 1.4 km || 
|-id=573 bgcolor=#d6d6d6
| 571573 ||  || — || September 10, 2007 || Mount Lemmon || Mount Lemmon Survey ||  || align=right | 2.1 km || 
|-id=574 bgcolor=#E9E9E9
| 571574 ||  || — || October 9, 2007 || Mount Lemmon || Mount Lemmon Survey || AEO || align=right | 1.1 km || 
|-id=575 bgcolor=#E9E9E9
| 571575 ||  || — || October 10, 2007 || Mount Lemmon || Mount Lemmon Survey ||  || align=right | 1.0 km || 
|-id=576 bgcolor=#fefefe
| 571576 ||  || — || September 13, 2007 || Catalina || CSS ||  || align=right | 1.3 km || 
|-id=577 bgcolor=#d6d6d6
| 571577 ||  || — || March 12, 2005 || Kitt Peak || Spacewatch ||  || align=right | 2.4 km || 
|-id=578 bgcolor=#d6d6d6
| 571578 ||  || — || October 10, 2007 || Kitt Peak || Spacewatch ||  || align=right | 1.9 km || 
|-id=579 bgcolor=#d6d6d6
| 571579 ||  || — || October 10, 2007 || Mount Lemmon || Mount Lemmon Survey ||  || align=right | 2.2 km || 
|-id=580 bgcolor=#fefefe
| 571580 ||  || — || October 10, 2007 || Kitt Peak || Spacewatch ||  || align=right data-sort-value="0.57" | 570 m || 
|-id=581 bgcolor=#fefefe
| 571581 ||  || — || October 9, 2007 || Kitt Peak || Spacewatch ||  || align=right data-sort-value="0.62" | 620 m || 
|-id=582 bgcolor=#d6d6d6
| 571582 ||  || — || October 11, 2007 || Kitt Peak || Spacewatch ||  || align=right | 2.2 km || 
|-id=583 bgcolor=#fefefe
| 571583 ||  || — || April 21, 2006 || Kitt Peak || Spacewatch ||  || align=right data-sort-value="0.60" | 600 m || 
|-id=584 bgcolor=#fefefe
| 571584 ||  || — || October 13, 2007 || Catalina || CSS || V || align=right data-sort-value="0.75" | 750 m || 
|-id=585 bgcolor=#d6d6d6
| 571585 ||  || — || October 10, 2007 || Mount Lemmon || Mount Lemmon Survey ||  || align=right | 2.1 km || 
|-id=586 bgcolor=#E9E9E9
| 571586 ||  || — || September 14, 2007 || Mount Lemmon || Mount Lemmon Survey ||  || align=right | 1.9 km || 
|-id=587 bgcolor=#E9E9E9
| 571587 ||  || — || March 8, 2005 || Mount Lemmon || Mount Lemmon Survey ||  || align=right | 2.2 km || 
|-id=588 bgcolor=#fefefe
| 571588 ||  || — || October 12, 2007 || Kitt Peak || Spacewatch ||  || align=right data-sort-value="0.79" | 790 m || 
|-id=589 bgcolor=#fefefe
| 571589 ||  || — || October 12, 2007 || Kitt Peak || Spacewatch ||  || align=right data-sort-value="0.68" | 680 m || 
|-id=590 bgcolor=#fefefe
| 571590 ||  || — || October 9, 2007 || Mount Lemmon || Mount Lemmon Survey ||  || align=right data-sort-value="0.60" | 600 m || 
|-id=591 bgcolor=#E9E9E9
| 571591 ||  || — || October 26, 1995 || Kitt Peak || Spacewatch ||  || align=right data-sort-value="0.78" | 780 m || 
|-id=592 bgcolor=#d6d6d6
| 571592 ||  || — || September 14, 2007 || Mount Lemmon || Mount Lemmon Survey ||  || align=right | 2.0 km || 
|-id=593 bgcolor=#fefefe
| 571593 ||  || — || October 11, 2007 || Kitt Peak || Spacewatch ||  || align=right data-sort-value="0.55" | 550 m || 
|-id=594 bgcolor=#d6d6d6
| 571594 ||  || — || October 12, 2007 || Kitt Peak || Spacewatch || 3:2 || align=right | 3.6 km || 
|-id=595 bgcolor=#fefefe
| 571595 ||  || — || September 15, 2007 || Mount Lemmon || Mount Lemmon Survey ||  || align=right data-sort-value="0.52" | 520 m || 
|-id=596 bgcolor=#fefefe
| 571596 ||  || — || October 12, 2007 || Kitt Peak || Spacewatch ||  || align=right data-sort-value="0.74" | 740 m || 
|-id=597 bgcolor=#fefefe
| 571597 ||  || — || October 11, 2007 || Kitt Peak || Spacewatch ||  || align=right data-sort-value="0.79" | 790 m || 
|-id=598 bgcolor=#E9E9E9
| 571598 ||  || — || October 11, 2007 || Kitt Peak || Spacewatch ||  || align=right | 1.6 km || 
|-id=599 bgcolor=#fefefe
| 571599 ||  || — || October 11, 2007 || Kitt Peak || Spacewatch ||  || align=right data-sort-value="0.74" | 740 m || 
|-id=600 bgcolor=#d6d6d6
| 571600 ||  || — || August 22, 2001 || Kitt Peak || Spacewatch ||  || align=right | 2.5 km || 
|}

571601–571700 

|-bgcolor=#fefefe
| 571601 ||  || — || September 26, 2007 || Mount Lemmon || Mount Lemmon Survey ||  || align=right data-sort-value="0.74" | 740 m || 
|-id=602 bgcolor=#E9E9E9
| 571602 ||  || — || October 10, 2007 || Mount Lemmon || Mount Lemmon Survey ||  || align=right | 1.4 km || 
|-id=603 bgcolor=#fefefe
| 571603 ||  || — || October 11, 2007 || Mount Lemmon || Mount Lemmon Survey ||  || align=right data-sort-value="0.64" | 640 m || 
|-id=604 bgcolor=#d6d6d6
| 571604 ||  || — || October 13, 2007 || Mount Lemmon || Mount Lemmon Survey ||  || align=right | 2.3 km || 
|-id=605 bgcolor=#fefefe
| 571605 ||  || — || August 23, 2003 || Palomar || NEAT || V || align=right data-sort-value="0.72" | 720 m || 
|-id=606 bgcolor=#d6d6d6
| 571606 ||  || — || October 11, 2007 || Mount Lemmon || Mount Lemmon Survey ||  || align=right | 1.7 km || 
|-id=607 bgcolor=#E9E9E9
| 571607 ||  || — || October 15, 2007 || Mount Lemmon || Mount Lemmon Survey ||  || align=right | 2.0 km || 
|-id=608 bgcolor=#d6d6d6
| 571608 ||  || — || September 13, 2007 || Mount Lemmon || Mount Lemmon Survey ||  || align=right | 1.9 km || 
|-id=609 bgcolor=#d6d6d6
| 571609 ||  || — || October 14, 2007 || Mount Lemmon || Mount Lemmon Survey ||  || align=right | 2.6 km || 
|-id=610 bgcolor=#d6d6d6
| 571610 ||  || — || November 14, 2002 || Palomar || NEAT ||  || align=right | 2.5 km || 
|-id=611 bgcolor=#fefefe
| 571611 ||  || — || October 15, 2007 || Kitt Peak || Spacewatch ||  || align=right data-sort-value="0.82" | 820 m || 
|-id=612 bgcolor=#fefefe
| 571612 ||  || — || January 19, 2005 || Kitt Peak || Spacewatch ||  || align=right data-sort-value="0.80" | 800 m || 
|-id=613 bgcolor=#fefefe
| 571613 ||  || — || July 24, 2003 || Palomar || NEAT ||  || align=right data-sort-value="0.91" | 910 m || 
|-id=614 bgcolor=#fefefe
| 571614 ||  || — || October 9, 2007 || Kitt Peak || Spacewatch ||  || align=right data-sort-value="0.83" | 830 m || 
|-id=615 bgcolor=#d6d6d6
| 571615 ||  || — || October 8, 2007 || Kitt Peak || Spacewatch ||  || align=right | 2.1 km || 
|-id=616 bgcolor=#E9E9E9
| 571616 ||  || — || October 25, 2016 || Haleakala || Pan-STARRS ||  || align=right | 1.1 km || 
|-id=617 bgcolor=#d6d6d6
| 571617 ||  || — || October 8, 2007 || Mount Lemmon || Mount Lemmon Survey ||  || align=right | 1.8 km || 
|-id=618 bgcolor=#fefefe
| 571618 ||  || — || October 11, 2007 || Kitt Peak || Spacewatch ||  || align=right data-sort-value="0.60" | 600 m || 
|-id=619 bgcolor=#d6d6d6
| 571619 ||  || — || October 7, 2007 || Mount Lemmon || Mount Lemmon Survey ||  || align=right | 2.2 km || 
|-id=620 bgcolor=#fefefe
| 571620 ||  || — || February 8, 2005 || Mauna Kea || Mauna Kea Obs. ||  || align=right data-sort-value="0.61" | 610 m || 
|-id=621 bgcolor=#d6d6d6
| 571621 ||  || — || January 23, 2015 || Haleakala || Pan-STARRS ||  || align=right | 2.7 km || 
|-id=622 bgcolor=#d6d6d6
| 571622 ||  || — || September 28, 1997 || Kitt Peak || Spacewatch ||  || align=right | 2.1 km || 
|-id=623 bgcolor=#d6d6d6
| 571623 ||  || — || January 27, 2015 || Haleakala || Pan-STARRS ||  || align=right | 2.2 km || 
|-id=624 bgcolor=#d6d6d6
| 571624 ||  || — || September 24, 2012 || Kitt Peak || Spacewatch ||  || align=right | 1.9 km || 
|-id=625 bgcolor=#d6d6d6
| 571625 ||  || — || October 7, 2007 || Mount Lemmon || Mount Lemmon Survey ||  || align=right | 1.7 km || 
|-id=626 bgcolor=#d6d6d6
| 571626 ||  || — || October 12, 2007 || Kitt Peak || Spacewatch ||  || align=right | 2.3 km || 
|-id=627 bgcolor=#d6d6d6
| 571627 ||  || — || March 21, 2015 || Haleakala || Pan-STARRS ||  || align=right | 1.6 km || 
|-id=628 bgcolor=#d6d6d6
| 571628 ||  || — || October 22, 2017 || Mount Lemmon || Mount Lemmon Survey ||  || align=right | 2.8 km || 
|-id=629 bgcolor=#fefefe
| 571629 ||  || — || October 11, 2007 || Mount Lemmon || Mount Lemmon Survey ||  || align=right data-sort-value="0.68" | 680 m || 
|-id=630 bgcolor=#fefefe
| 571630 ||  || — || November 28, 2011 || Mount Lemmon || Mount Lemmon Survey ||  || align=right | 1.1 km || 
|-id=631 bgcolor=#fefefe
| 571631 ||  || — || October 11, 2007 || Kitt Peak || Spacewatch ||  || align=right data-sort-value="0.63" | 630 m || 
|-id=632 bgcolor=#E9E9E9
| 571632 ||  || — || February 26, 2014 || Haleakala || Pan-STARRS ||  || align=right | 1.8 km || 
|-id=633 bgcolor=#d6d6d6
| 571633 ||  || — || October 12, 2007 || Mount Lemmon || Mount Lemmon Survey ||  || align=right | 2.0 km || 
|-id=634 bgcolor=#d6d6d6
| 571634 ||  || — || October 4, 2007 || Kitt Peak || Spacewatch ||  || align=right | 1.7 km || 
|-id=635 bgcolor=#d6d6d6
| 571635 ||  || — || October 12, 2007 || Mount Lemmon || Mount Lemmon Survey ||  || align=right | 1.8 km || 
|-id=636 bgcolor=#E9E9E9
| 571636 ||  || — || October 15, 2007 || Mount Lemmon || Mount Lemmon Survey ||  || align=right | 1.8 km || 
|-id=637 bgcolor=#d6d6d6
| 571637 ||  || — || January 29, 2009 || Mount Lemmon || Mount Lemmon Survey ||  || align=right | 2.0 km || 
|-id=638 bgcolor=#E9E9E9
| 571638 ||  || — || December 23, 2017 || Haleakala || Pan-STARRS ||  || align=right | 1.5 km || 
|-id=639 bgcolor=#d6d6d6
| 571639 ||  || — || October 15, 2007 || Kitt Peak || Spacewatch ||  || align=right | 1.7 km || 
|-id=640 bgcolor=#fefefe
| 571640 ||  || — || October 28, 2011 || Mount Lemmon || Mount Lemmon Survey ||  || align=right data-sort-value="0.71" | 710 m || 
|-id=641 bgcolor=#E9E9E9
| 571641 ||  || — || January 7, 2014 || Mount Lemmon || Mount Lemmon Survey ||  || align=right | 1.3 km || 
|-id=642 bgcolor=#d6d6d6
| 571642 ||  || — || October 12, 2007 || Mount Lemmon || Mount Lemmon Survey ||  || align=right | 2.0 km || 
|-id=643 bgcolor=#E9E9E9
| 571643 ||  || — || October 9, 2012 || Haleakala || Pan-STARRS ||  || align=right | 1.6 km || 
|-id=644 bgcolor=#fefefe
| 571644 ||  || — || October 15, 2007 || Mount Lemmon || Mount Lemmon Survey ||  || align=right data-sort-value="0.90" | 900 m || 
|-id=645 bgcolor=#d6d6d6
| 571645 ||  || — || October 10, 2007 || Kitt Peak || Spacewatch ||  || align=right | 2.0 km || 
|-id=646 bgcolor=#d6d6d6
| 571646 ||  || — || October 12, 2007 || Kitt Peak || Spacewatch ||  || align=right | 1.6 km || 
|-id=647 bgcolor=#d6d6d6
| 571647 ||  || — || October 15, 2007 || Mount Lemmon || Mount Lemmon Survey ||  || align=right | 2.8 km || 
|-id=648 bgcolor=#d6d6d6
| 571648 ||  || — || October 7, 2007 || Kitt Peak || Spacewatch ||  || align=right | 2.1 km || 
|-id=649 bgcolor=#E9E9E9
| 571649 ||  || — || October 4, 2007 || Mount Lemmon || Mount Lemmon Survey ||  || align=right | 1.8 km || 
|-id=650 bgcolor=#d6d6d6
| 571650 ||  || — || October 7, 2007 || Mount Lemmon || Mount Lemmon Survey ||  || align=right | 1.9 km || 
|-id=651 bgcolor=#E9E9E9
| 571651 ||  || — || October 11, 2007 || Mount Lemmon || Mount Lemmon Survey ||  || align=right | 1.7 km || 
|-id=652 bgcolor=#E9E9E9
| 571652 ||  || — || April 11, 2005 || Mount Lemmon || Mount Lemmon Survey ||  || align=right | 1.9 km || 
|-id=653 bgcolor=#E9E9E9
| 571653 ||  || — || October 8, 2007 || Mount Lemmon || Mount Lemmon Survey ||  || align=right | 1.6 km || 
|-id=654 bgcolor=#d6d6d6
| 571654 ||  || — || October 9, 2007 || Kitt Peak || Spacewatch ||  || align=right | 2.0 km || 
|-id=655 bgcolor=#d6d6d6
| 571655 ||  || — || October 12, 2007 || Kitt Peak || Spacewatch ||  || align=right | 1.9 km || 
|-id=656 bgcolor=#fefefe
| 571656 ||  || — || October 13, 2007 || Mount Lemmon || Mount Lemmon Survey ||  || align=right data-sort-value="0.68" | 680 m || 
|-id=657 bgcolor=#d6d6d6
| 571657 ||  || — || October 15, 2007 || Mount Lemmon || Mount Lemmon Survey ||  || align=right | 1.8 km || 
|-id=658 bgcolor=#d6d6d6
| 571658 ||  || — || October 9, 2007 || Kitt Peak || Spacewatch ||  || align=right | 2.3 km || 
|-id=659 bgcolor=#fefefe
| 571659 ||  || — || October 12, 2007 || Kitt Peak || Spacewatch ||  || align=right data-sort-value="0.72" | 720 m || 
|-id=660 bgcolor=#E9E9E9
| 571660 ||  || — || October 8, 2007 || Mount Lemmon || Mount Lemmon Survey ||  || align=right | 1.2 km || 
|-id=661 bgcolor=#d6d6d6
| 571661 ||  || — || October 15, 2007 || Mount Lemmon || Mount Lemmon Survey ||  || align=right | 1.8 km || 
|-id=662 bgcolor=#d6d6d6
| 571662 ||  || — || October 14, 2007 || Mount Lemmon || Mount Lemmon Survey ||  || align=right | 2.8 km || 
|-id=663 bgcolor=#d6d6d6
| 571663 ||  || — || October 17, 2007 || Mount Lemmon || Mount Lemmon Survey ||  || align=right | 2.5 km || 
|-id=664 bgcolor=#fefefe
| 571664 ||  || — || September 12, 2007 || Mount Lemmon || Mount Lemmon Survey ||  || align=right data-sort-value="0.58" | 580 m || 
|-id=665 bgcolor=#d6d6d6
| 571665 ||  || — || October 13, 2007 || Dauban || F. Kugel ||  || align=right | 2.8 km || 
|-id=666 bgcolor=#d6d6d6
| 571666 ||  || — || October 16, 2007 || Kitt Peak || Spacewatch ||  || align=right | 1.8 km || 
|-id=667 bgcolor=#fefefe
| 571667 ||  || — || October 7, 2007 || Mount Lemmon || Mount Lemmon Survey ||  || align=right data-sort-value="0.76" | 760 m || 
|-id=668 bgcolor=#d6d6d6
| 571668 ||  || — || October 8, 2007 || Mount Lemmon || Mount Lemmon Survey ||  || align=right | 1.9 km || 
|-id=669 bgcolor=#fefefe
| 571669 ||  || — || October 16, 2007 || Catalina || CSS ||  || align=right data-sort-value="0.69" | 690 m || 
|-id=670 bgcolor=#d6d6d6
| 571670 ||  || — || October 18, 2007 || Kitt Peak || Spacewatch ||  || align=right | 2.2 km || 
|-id=671 bgcolor=#fefefe
| 571671 ||  || — || September 26, 2000 || Kitt Peak || Spacewatch ||  || align=right data-sort-value="0.78" | 780 m || 
|-id=672 bgcolor=#fefefe
| 571672 ||  || — || October 18, 2007 || Kitt Peak || Spacewatch ||  || align=right data-sort-value="0.78" | 780 m || 
|-id=673 bgcolor=#d6d6d6
| 571673 ||  || — || October 30, 2007 || Kitt Peak || Spacewatch ||  || align=right | 2.2 km || 
|-id=674 bgcolor=#fefefe
| 571674 ||  || — || October 30, 2007 || Kitt Peak || Spacewatch ||  || align=right data-sort-value="0.65" | 650 m || 
|-id=675 bgcolor=#E9E9E9
| 571675 ||  || — || May 20, 2006 || Kitt Peak || Spacewatch ||  || align=right data-sort-value="0.82" | 820 m || 
|-id=676 bgcolor=#fefefe
| 571676 ||  || — || October 30, 2007 || Mount Lemmon || Mount Lemmon Survey ||  || align=right data-sort-value="0.64" | 640 m || 
|-id=677 bgcolor=#fefefe
| 571677 ||  || — || February 21, 2002 || Kitt Peak || Spacewatch ||  || align=right data-sort-value="0.67" | 670 m || 
|-id=678 bgcolor=#d6d6d6
| 571678 ||  || — || October 30, 2007 || Mount Lemmon || Mount Lemmon Survey ||  || align=right | 2.0 km || 
|-id=679 bgcolor=#d6d6d6
| 571679 ||  || — || October 31, 2007 || Mount Lemmon || Mount Lemmon Survey ||  || align=right | 1.7 km || 
|-id=680 bgcolor=#fefefe
| 571680 ||  || — || October 31, 2007 || Mount Lemmon || Mount Lemmon Survey ||  || align=right data-sort-value="0.76" | 760 m || 
|-id=681 bgcolor=#d6d6d6
| 571681 ||  || — || October 18, 2007 || Kitt Peak || Spacewatch ||  || align=right | 2.2 km || 
|-id=682 bgcolor=#d6d6d6
| 571682 ||  || — || October 30, 2007 || Mount Lemmon || Mount Lemmon Survey ||  || align=right | 2.1 km || 
|-id=683 bgcolor=#fefefe
| 571683 ||  || — || March 9, 2005 || Mount Lemmon || Mount Lemmon Survey ||  || align=right data-sort-value="0.60" | 600 m || 
|-id=684 bgcolor=#d6d6d6
| 571684 ||  || — || October 30, 2007 || Kitt Peak || Spacewatch ||  || align=right | 2.1 km || 
|-id=685 bgcolor=#fefefe
| 571685 ||  || — || October 30, 2007 || Kitt Peak || Spacewatch ||  || align=right data-sort-value="0.79" | 790 m || 
|-id=686 bgcolor=#E9E9E9
| 571686 ||  || — || October 10, 2007 || Kitt Peak || Spacewatch ||  || align=right | 1.2 km || 
|-id=687 bgcolor=#fefefe
| 571687 ||  || — || October 30, 2007 || Mount Lemmon || Mount Lemmon Survey ||  || align=right data-sort-value="0.60" | 600 m || 
|-id=688 bgcolor=#d6d6d6
| 571688 ||  || — || September 12, 2007 || Mount Lemmon || Mount Lemmon Survey ||  || align=right | 2.1 km || 
|-id=689 bgcolor=#d6d6d6
| 571689 ||  || — || October 31, 2007 || Mount Lemmon || Mount Lemmon Survey ||  || align=right | 1.9 km || 
|-id=690 bgcolor=#E9E9E9
| 571690 ||  || — || October 8, 2007 || Bergisch Gladbach || W. Bickel || critical || align=right data-sort-value="0.54" | 540 m || 
|-id=691 bgcolor=#d6d6d6
| 571691 ||  || — || October 16, 2007 || Mount Lemmon || Mount Lemmon Survey ||  || align=right | 2.6 km || 
|-id=692 bgcolor=#E9E9E9
| 571692 ||  || — || October 30, 2007 || Mount Lemmon || Mount Lemmon Survey ||  || align=right | 1.1 km || 
|-id=693 bgcolor=#fefefe
| 571693 ||  || — || October 30, 2007 || Kitt Peak || Spacewatch ||  || align=right data-sort-value="0.63" | 630 m || 
|-id=694 bgcolor=#fefefe
| 571694 ||  || — || October 19, 2007 || Kitt Peak || Spacewatch ||  || align=right data-sort-value="0.71" | 710 m || 
|-id=695 bgcolor=#fefefe
| 571695 ||  || — || October 31, 2007 || Mount Lemmon || Mount Lemmon Survey ||  || align=right data-sort-value="0.66" | 660 m || 
|-id=696 bgcolor=#d6d6d6
| 571696 ||  || — || October 18, 2007 || Kitt Peak || Spacewatch ||  || align=right | 1.6 km || 
|-id=697 bgcolor=#E9E9E9
| 571697 ||  || — || October 16, 2007 || Mount Lemmon || Mount Lemmon Survey ||  || align=right | 1.7 km || 
|-id=698 bgcolor=#d6d6d6
| 571698 ||  || — || October 19, 2007 || Mount Lemmon || Mount Lemmon Survey ||  || align=right | 3.2 km || 
|-id=699 bgcolor=#fefefe
| 571699 ||  || — || October 20, 2007 || Mount Lemmon || Mount Lemmon Survey ||  || align=right data-sort-value="0.59" | 590 m || 
|-id=700 bgcolor=#d6d6d6
| 571700 ||  || — || October 21, 2007 || Mount Lemmon || Mount Lemmon Survey ||  || align=right | 1.9 km || 
|}

571701–571800 

|-bgcolor=#d6d6d6
| 571701 ||  || — || October 15, 2012 || Haleakala || Pan-STARRS ||  || align=right | 2.0 km || 
|-id=702 bgcolor=#fefefe
| 571702 ||  || — || October 20, 2007 || Mount Lemmon || Mount Lemmon Survey ||  || align=right data-sort-value="0.82" | 820 m || 
|-id=703 bgcolor=#E9E9E9
| 571703 ||  || — || September 10, 2016 || Mount Lemmon || Mount Lemmon Survey ||  || align=right | 2.1 km || 
|-id=704 bgcolor=#E9E9E9
| 571704 ||  || — || October 16, 2007 || Mount Lemmon || Mount Lemmon Survey ||  || align=right | 2.1 km || 
|-id=705 bgcolor=#fefefe
| 571705 ||  || — || October 23, 2011 || Kitt Peak || Spacewatch ||  || align=right data-sort-value="0.82" | 820 m || 
|-id=706 bgcolor=#E9E9E9
| 571706 ||  || — || October 20, 2007 || Kitt Peak || Spacewatch ||  || align=right | 2.0 km || 
|-id=707 bgcolor=#d6d6d6
| 571707 ||  || — || October 16, 2007 || Mount Lemmon || Mount Lemmon Survey ||  || align=right | 2.3 km || 
|-id=708 bgcolor=#d6d6d6
| 571708 ||  || — || February 8, 2014 || Mount Lemmon || Mount Lemmon Survey ||  || align=right | 1.9 km || 
|-id=709 bgcolor=#E9E9E9
| 571709 ||  || — || January 13, 2018 || Mount Lemmon || Mount Lemmon Survey ||  || align=right | 1.8 km || 
|-id=710 bgcolor=#d6d6d6
| 571710 ||  || — || November 12, 2013 || Kitt Peak || Spacewatch ||  || align=right | 2.1 km || 
|-id=711 bgcolor=#d6d6d6
| 571711 ||  || — || January 24, 2014 || Haleakala || Pan-STARRS ||  || align=right | 2.1 km || 
|-id=712 bgcolor=#d6d6d6
| 571712 ||  || — || October 8, 2012 || Kitt Peak || Spacewatch ||  || align=right | 1.9 km || 
|-id=713 bgcolor=#d6d6d6
| 571713 ||  || — || October 20, 2007 || Mount Lemmon || Mount Lemmon Survey ||  || align=right | 2.2 km || 
|-id=714 bgcolor=#fefefe
| 571714 ||  || — || October 21, 2007 || Mount Lemmon || Mount Lemmon Survey ||  || align=right data-sort-value="0.70" | 700 m || 
|-id=715 bgcolor=#d6d6d6
| 571715 ||  || — || October 16, 2012 || Mount Lemmon || Mount Lemmon Survey ||  || align=right | 1.8 km || 
|-id=716 bgcolor=#d6d6d6
| 571716 ||  || — || October 18, 2007 || Mount Lemmon || Mount Lemmon Survey ||  || align=right | 1.6 km || 
|-id=717 bgcolor=#d6d6d6
| 571717 ||  || — || October 20, 2007 || Mount Lemmon || Mount Lemmon Survey ||  || align=right | 1.9 km || 
|-id=718 bgcolor=#fefefe
| 571718 ||  || — || October 21, 2007 || Mount Lemmon || Mount Lemmon Survey ||  || align=right data-sort-value="0.57" | 570 m || 
|-id=719 bgcolor=#d6d6d6
| 571719 ||  || — || October 30, 2007 || Mount Lemmon || Mount Lemmon Survey ||  || align=right | 1.7 km || 
|-id=720 bgcolor=#E9E9E9
| 571720 ||  || — || October 16, 2007 || Mount Lemmon || Mount Lemmon Survey ||  || align=right | 1.8 km || 
|-id=721 bgcolor=#d6d6d6
| 571721 ||  || — || November 4, 2007 || La Sagra || OAM Obs. ||  || align=right | 3.2 km || 
|-id=722 bgcolor=#d6d6d6
| 571722 ||  || — || October 12, 2007 || Kitt Peak || Spacewatch ||  || align=right | 2.0 km || 
|-id=723 bgcolor=#E9E9E9
| 571723 ||  || — || October 9, 2007 || Kitt Peak || Spacewatch ||  || align=right | 2.4 km || 
|-id=724 bgcolor=#d6d6d6
| 571724 ||  || — || November 2, 2007 || Mount Lemmon || Mount Lemmon Survey ||  || align=right | 1.8 km || 
|-id=725 bgcolor=#d6d6d6
| 571725 ||  || — || November 3, 2007 || Mount Lemmon || Mount Lemmon Survey ||  || align=right | 1.9 km || 
|-id=726 bgcolor=#d6d6d6
| 571726 ||  || — || November 2, 2007 || Kitt Peak || Spacewatch || EOS || align=right | 1.6 km || 
|-id=727 bgcolor=#d6d6d6
| 571727 ||  || — || October 15, 2007 || Kitt Peak || Spacewatch ||  || align=right | 1.8 km || 
|-id=728 bgcolor=#fefefe
| 571728 ||  || — || October 8, 2007 || Mount Lemmon || Mount Lemmon Survey ||  || align=right data-sort-value="0.62" | 620 m || 
|-id=729 bgcolor=#d6d6d6
| 571729 ||  || — || October 12, 2007 || Mount Lemmon || Mount Lemmon Survey ||  || align=right | 2.3 km || 
|-id=730 bgcolor=#d6d6d6
| 571730 ||  || — || November 3, 2007 || Mount Lemmon || Mount Lemmon Survey ||  || align=right | 2.6 km || 
|-id=731 bgcolor=#d6d6d6
| 571731 ||  || — || November 1, 2007 || Kitt Peak || Spacewatch ||  || align=right | 3.7 km || 
|-id=732 bgcolor=#fefefe
| 571732 ||  || — || March 20, 2002 || Kitt Peak || Kitt Peak Obs. ||  || align=right data-sort-value="0.64" | 640 m || 
|-id=733 bgcolor=#d6d6d6
| 571733 ||  || — || November 1, 2007 || Kitt Peak || Spacewatch ||  || align=right | 2.5 km || 
|-id=734 bgcolor=#E9E9E9
| 571734 ||  || — || October 20, 2007 || Mount Lemmon || Mount Lemmon Survey ||  || align=right | 1.8 km || 
|-id=735 bgcolor=#d6d6d6
| 571735 ||  || — || November 4, 2007 || Mount Lemmon || Mount Lemmon Survey ||  || align=right | 1.6 km || 
|-id=736 bgcolor=#d6d6d6
| 571736 ||  || — || November 3, 2007 || Kitt Peak || Spacewatch ||  || align=right | 2.2 km || 
|-id=737 bgcolor=#d6d6d6
| 571737 ||  || — || November 4, 2007 || Kitt Peak || Spacewatch ||  || align=right | 2.1 km || 
|-id=738 bgcolor=#d6d6d6
| 571738 ||  || — || October 8, 2007 || Catalina || CSS || BRA || align=right | 1.2 km || 
|-id=739 bgcolor=#d6d6d6
| 571739 ||  || — || November 3, 2007 || Kitt Peak || Spacewatch ||  || align=right | 2.0 km || 
|-id=740 bgcolor=#d6d6d6
| 571740 ||  || — || November 3, 2007 || Kitt Peak || Spacewatch || EOS || align=right | 1.6 km || 
|-id=741 bgcolor=#d6d6d6
| 571741 ||  || — || October 15, 2007 || Mount Lemmon || Mount Lemmon Survey ||  || align=right | 2.2 km || 
|-id=742 bgcolor=#d6d6d6
| 571742 ||  || — || November 3, 2007 || Kitt Peak || Spacewatch ||  || align=right | 2.1 km || 
|-id=743 bgcolor=#fefefe
| 571743 ||  || — || November 3, 2007 || Kitt Peak || Spacewatch ||  || align=right data-sort-value="0.59" | 590 m || 
|-id=744 bgcolor=#d6d6d6
| 571744 ||  || — || November 4, 2007 || Kitt Peak || Spacewatch ||  || align=right | 1.8 km || 
|-id=745 bgcolor=#fefefe
| 571745 ||  || — || October 14, 2007 || Kitt Peak || Spacewatch ||  || align=right data-sort-value="0.62" | 620 m || 
|-id=746 bgcolor=#fefefe
| 571746 ||  || — || September 28, 2003 || Kitt Peak || Spacewatch ||  || align=right | 1.0 km || 
|-id=747 bgcolor=#fefefe
| 571747 ||  || — || November 5, 2007 || Kitt Peak || Spacewatch ||  || align=right data-sort-value="0.54" | 540 m || 
|-id=748 bgcolor=#d6d6d6
| 571748 ||  || — || September 9, 2007 || Mount Lemmon || Mount Lemmon Survey ||  || align=right | 2.9 km || 
|-id=749 bgcolor=#d6d6d6
| 571749 ||  || — || November 4, 2007 || Kitt Peak || Spacewatch || EOS || align=right | 1.6 km || 
|-id=750 bgcolor=#d6d6d6
| 571750 ||  || — || September 14, 2007 || Mount Lemmon || Mount Lemmon Survey ||  || align=right | 2.1 km || 
|-id=751 bgcolor=#fefefe
| 571751 ||  || — || January 16, 2005 || Kitt Peak || Spacewatch ||  || align=right data-sort-value="0.71" | 710 m || 
|-id=752 bgcolor=#fefefe
| 571752 ||  || — || October 18, 2007 || Kitt Peak || Spacewatch ||  || align=right data-sort-value="0.62" | 620 m || 
|-id=753 bgcolor=#E9E9E9
| 571753 ||  || — || November 2, 2007 || Mount Lemmon || Mount Lemmon Survey ||  || align=right data-sort-value="0.90" | 900 m || 
|-id=754 bgcolor=#fefefe
| 571754 ||  || — || October 24, 2007 || Mount Lemmon || Mount Lemmon Survey ||  || align=right data-sort-value="0.72" | 720 m || 
|-id=755 bgcolor=#d6d6d6
| 571755 ||  || — || November 5, 2007 || Kitt Peak || Spacewatch ||  || align=right | 2.2 km || 
|-id=756 bgcolor=#d6d6d6
| 571756 ||  || — || November 5, 2007 || Kitt Peak || Spacewatch ||  || align=right | 2.7 km || 
|-id=757 bgcolor=#d6d6d6
| 571757 ||  || — || November 5, 2007 || Kitt Peak || Spacewatch ||  || align=right | 2.9 km || 
|-id=758 bgcolor=#fefefe
| 571758 ||  || — || November 5, 2007 || Kitt Peak || Spacewatch ||  || align=right data-sort-value="0.88" | 880 m || 
|-id=759 bgcolor=#E9E9E9
| 571759 ||  || — || October 14, 2007 || Mount Lemmon || Mount Lemmon Survey ||  || align=right | 1.4 km || 
|-id=760 bgcolor=#fefefe
| 571760 ||  || — || November 2, 2007 || Mount Lemmon || Mount Lemmon Survey ||  || align=right data-sort-value="0.53" | 530 m || 
|-id=761 bgcolor=#d6d6d6
| 571761 ||  || — || November 8, 2007 || Mount Lemmon || Mount Lemmon Survey || Tj (2.96) || align=right | 4.6 km || 
|-id=762 bgcolor=#fefefe
| 571762 ||  || — || November 4, 2007 || Kitt Peak || Spacewatch ||  || align=right data-sort-value="0.60" | 600 m || 
|-id=763 bgcolor=#fefefe
| 571763 ||  || — || November 8, 2007 || Kitt Peak || Spacewatch ||  || align=right data-sort-value="0.78" | 780 m || 
|-id=764 bgcolor=#fefefe
| 571764 ||  || — || October 30, 2007 || Mount Lemmon || Mount Lemmon Survey ||  || align=right data-sort-value="0.58" | 580 m || 
|-id=765 bgcolor=#fefefe
| 571765 ||  || — || October 18, 2007 || Kitt Peak || Spacewatch ||  || align=right data-sort-value="0.67" | 670 m || 
|-id=766 bgcolor=#fefefe
| 571766 ||  || — || November 9, 2007 || Kitt Peak || Spacewatch ||  || align=right data-sort-value="0.82" | 820 m || 
|-id=767 bgcolor=#E9E9E9
| 571767 ||  || — || April 4, 2005 || Mount Lemmon || Mount Lemmon Survey ||  || align=right | 2.0 km || 
|-id=768 bgcolor=#d6d6d6
| 571768 ||  || — || November 9, 2007 || Kitt Peak || Spacewatch ||  || align=right | 2.0 km || 
|-id=769 bgcolor=#d6d6d6
| 571769 ||  || — || November 9, 2007 || Kitt Peak || Spacewatch ||  || align=right | 2.1 km || 
|-id=770 bgcolor=#E9E9E9
| 571770 ||  || — || November 9, 2007 || Kitt Peak || Spacewatch ||  || align=right | 2.1 km || 
|-id=771 bgcolor=#d6d6d6
| 571771 ||  || — || November 12, 2007 || Mount Lemmon || Mount Lemmon Survey ||  || align=right | 1.8 km || 
|-id=772 bgcolor=#d6d6d6
| 571772 ||  || — || November 7, 2007 || Kitt Peak || Spacewatch || 3:2 || align=right | 3.6 km || 
|-id=773 bgcolor=#d6d6d6
| 571773 ||  || — || October 16, 2007 || Kitt Peak || Spacewatch ||  || align=right | 1.8 km || 
|-id=774 bgcolor=#E9E9E9
| 571774 ||  || — || October 12, 2007 || Mount Lemmon || Mount Lemmon Survey ||  || align=right | 1.8 km || 
|-id=775 bgcolor=#d6d6d6
| 571775 ||  || — || October 17, 2007 || Mount Lemmon || Mount Lemmon Survey ||  || align=right | 2.8 km || 
|-id=776 bgcolor=#fefefe
| 571776 ||  || — || November 7, 2007 || Kitt Peak || Spacewatch ||  || align=right data-sort-value="0.68" | 680 m || 
|-id=777 bgcolor=#d6d6d6
| 571777 ||  || — || October 16, 2007 || Mount Lemmon || Mount Lemmon Survey ||  || align=right | 2.0 km || 
|-id=778 bgcolor=#fefefe
| 571778 ||  || — || November 9, 2007 || Mount Lemmon || Mount Lemmon Survey ||  || align=right data-sort-value="0.66" | 660 m || 
|-id=779 bgcolor=#E9E9E9
| 571779 ||  || — || October 9, 2007 || Kitt Peak || Spacewatch ||  || align=right | 2.2 km || 
|-id=780 bgcolor=#fefefe
| 571780 ||  || — || November 13, 2007 || Mount Lemmon || Mount Lemmon Survey ||  || align=right data-sort-value="0.53" | 530 m || 
|-id=781 bgcolor=#d6d6d6
| 571781 ||  || — || October 9, 2007 || Mount Lemmon || Mount Lemmon Survey ||  || align=right | 1.9 km || 
|-id=782 bgcolor=#fefefe
| 571782 ||  || — || September 18, 2003 || Anderson Mesa || LONEOS ||  || align=right data-sort-value="0.67" | 670 m || 
|-id=783 bgcolor=#E9E9E9
| 571783 ||  || — || November 14, 2007 || Kitt Peak || Spacewatch ||  || align=right | 1.4 km || 
|-id=784 bgcolor=#d6d6d6
| 571784 ||  || — || November 12, 2007 || Mount Lemmon || Mount Lemmon Survey ||  || align=right | 2.2 km || 
|-id=785 bgcolor=#d6d6d6
| 571785 ||  || — || October 14, 2007 || Mount Lemmon || Mount Lemmon Survey ||  || align=right | 2.1 km || 
|-id=786 bgcolor=#FA8072
| 571786 ||  || — || October 30, 2007 || Catalina || CSS ||  || align=right data-sort-value="0.58" | 580 m || 
|-id=787 bgcolor=#fefefe
| 571787 ||  || — || October 8, 2007 || Mount Lemmon || Mount Lemmon Survey ||  || align=right data-sort-value="0.76" | 760 m || 
|-id=788 bgcolor=#d6d6d6
| 571788 ||  || — || November 2, 2007 || Socorro || LINEAR ||  || align=right | 3.0 km || 
|-id=789 bgcolor=#fefefe
| 571789 ||  || — || July 5, 2003 || Kitt Peak || Spacewatch ||  || align=right data-sort-value="0.85" | 850 m || 
|-id=790 bgcolor=#d6d6d6
| 571790 ||  || — || November 7, 2007 || Catalina || CSS ||  || align=right | 2.8 km || 
|-id=791 bgcolor=#fefefe
| 571791 ||  || — || October 9, 2007 || XuYi || PMO NEO ||  || align=right data-sort-value="0.59" | 590 m || 
|-id=792 bgcolor=#d6d6d6
| 571792 ||  || — || November 3, 2007 || Mount Lemmon || Mount Lemmon Survey ||  || align=right | 2.2 km || 
|-id=793 bgcolor=#d6d6d6
| 571793 ||  || — || November 8, 2007 || Kitt Peak || Spacewatch ||  || align=right | 2.5 km || 
|-id=794 bgcolor=#d6d6d6
| 571794 ||  || — || November 3, 2007 || Kitt Peak || Spacewatch ||  || align=right | 2.0 km || 
|-id=795 bgcolor=#d6d6d6
| 571795 ||  || — || November 4, 2007 || Mount Lemmon || Mount Lemmon Survey ||  || align=right | 2.4 km || 
|-id=796 bgcolor=#d6d6d6
| 571796 ||  || — || November 4, 2007 || Mount Lemmon || Mount Lemmon Survey ||  || align=right | 2.2 km || 
|-id=797 bgcolor=#d6d6d6
| 571797 ||  || — || November 12, 2007 || Mount Lemmon || Mount Lemmon Survey ||  || align=right | 2.1 km || 
|-id=798 bgcolor=#d6d6d6
| 571798 ||  || — || November 13, 2007 || Mount Lemmon || Mount Lemmon Survey ||  || align=right | 2.7 km || 
|-id=799 bgcolor=#d6d6d6
| 571799 ||  || — || October 21, 2012 || Haleakala || Pan-STARRS ||  || align=right | 2.3 km || 
|-id=800 bgcolor=#fefefe
| 571800 ||  || — || March 19, 2013 || Haleakala || Pan-STARRS ||  || align=right data-sort-value="0.68" | 680 m || 
|}

571801–571900 

|-bgcolor=#d6d6d6
| 571801 ||  || — || November 12, 2007 || Mount Lemmon || Mount Lemmon Survey ||  || align=right | 2.5 km || 
|-id=802 bgcolor=#d6d6d6
| 571802 ||  || — || November 7, 2007 || Kitt Peak || Spacewatch ||  || align=right | 2.9 km || 
|-id=803 bgcolor=#d6d6d6
| 571803 ||  || — || July 11, 2016 || Haleakala || Pan-STARRS ||  || align=right | 2.7 km || 
|-id=804 bgcolor=#d6d6d6
| 571804 ||  || — || November 9, 2007 || Kitt Peak || Spacewatch ||  || align=right | 2.9 km || 
|-id=805 bgcolor=#d6d6d6
| 571805 ||  || — || November 2, 2007 || Kitt Peak || Spacewatch || 3:2 || align=right | 4.2 km || 
|-id=806 bgcolor=#d6d6d6
| 571806 ||  || — || January 26, 2014 || Haleakala || Pan-STARRS ||  || align=right | 2.3 km || 
|-id=807 bgcolor=#d6d6d6
| 571807 ||  || — || November 5, 2007 || Mount Lemmon || Mount Lemmon Survey ||  || align=right | 2.4 km || 
|-id=808 bgcolor=#E9E9E9
| 571808 ||  || — || June 18, 2015 || Haleakala || Pan-STARRS ||  || align=right | 1.8 km || 
|-id=809 bgcolor=#d6d6d6
| 571809 ||  || — || January 21, 2014 || Kitt Peak || Spacewatch ||  || align=right | 2.1 km || 
|-id=810 bgcolor=#d6d6d6
| 571810 ||  || — || October 1, 2017 || Haleakala || Pan-STARRS ||  || align=right | 1.8 km || 
|-id=811 bgcolor=#E9E9E9
| 571811 ||  || — || November 8, 2007 || Mount Lemmon || Mount Lemmon Survey ||  || align=right | 2.2 km || 
|-id=812 bgcolor=#d6d6d6
| 571812 ||  || — || November 5, 2007 || Mount Lemmon || Mount Lemmon Survey ||  || align=right | 3.2 km || 
|-id=813 bgcolor=#d6d6d6
| 571813 ||  || — || December 11, 2013 || Haleakala || Pan-STARRS ||  || align=right | 2.7 km || 
|-id=814 bgcolor=#d6d6d6
| 571814 ||  || — || November 7, 2007 || Kitt Peak || Spacewatch ||  || align=right | 2.1 km || 
|-id=815 bgcolor=#d6d6d6
| 571815 ||  || — || September 2, 2017 || Haleakala || Pan-STARRS ||  || align=right | 2.9 km || 
|-id=816 bgcolor=#d6d6d6
| 571816 ||  || — || November 8, 2007 || Kitt Peak || Spacewatch ||  || align=right | 2.1 km || 
|-id=817 bgcolor=#d6d6d6
| 571817 ||  || — || December 5, 2008 || Mount Lemmon || Mount Lemmon Survey ||  || align=right | 2.9 km || 
|-id=818 bgcolor=#d6d6d6
| 571818 ||  || — || November 4, 2007 || Kitt Peak || Spacewatch ||  || align=right | 2.7 km || 
|-id=819 bgcolor=#d6d6d6
| 571819 ||  || — || November 13, 2007 || Mount Lemmon || Mount Lemmon Survey ||  || align=right | 1.9 km || 
|-id=820 bgcolor=#d6d6d6
| 571820 ||  || — || June 12, 2015 || Mount Lemmon || Mount Lemmon Survey ||  || align=right | 2.2 km || 
|-id=821 bgcolor=#d6d6d6
| 571821 ||  || — || November 2, 2007 || Kitt Peak || Spacewatch ||  || align=right | 2.0 km || 
|-id=822 bgcolor=#fefefe
| 571822 ||  || — || November 9, 2007 || Kitt Peak || Spacewatch ||  || align=right data-sort-value="0.74" | 740 m || 
|-id=823 bgcolor=#d6d6d6
| 571823 ||  || — || October 8, 2012 || Mount Lemmon || Mount Lemmon Survey ||  || align=right | 1.8 km || 
|-id=824 bgcolor=#d6d6d6
| 571824 ||  || — || November 8, 2007 || Kitt Peak || Spacewatch ||  || align=right | 2.1 km || 
|-id=825 bgcolor=#d6d6d6
| 571825 ||  || — || December 6, 2013 || Nogales || M. Schwartz, P. R. Holvorcem ||  || align=right | 3.3 km || 
|-id=826 bgcolor=#d6d6d6
| 571826 ||  || — || November 4, 2007 || Kitt Peak || Spacewatch ||  || align=right | 2.7 km || 
|-id=827 bgcolor=#fefefe
| 571827 ||  || — || April 12, 2013 || Haleakala || Pan-STARRS ||  || align=right data-sort-value="0.64" | 640 m || 
|-id=828 bgcolor=#d6d6d6
| 571828 ||  || — || November 3, 2007 || Mount Lemmon || Mount Lemmon Survey ||  || align=right | 2.8 km || 
|-id=829 bgcolor=#fefefe
| 571829 ||  || — || September 19, 2003 || Kitt Peak || Spacewatch ||  || align=right data-sort-value="0.62" | 620 m || 
|-id=830 bgcolor=#d6d6d6
| 571830 ||  || — || November 3, 2007 || Kitt Peak || Spacewatch ||  || align=right | 2.8 km || 
|-id=831 bgcolor=#d6d6d6
| 571831 ||  || — || November 11, 2007 || Mount Lemmon || Mount Lemmon Survey ||  || align=right | 2.2 km || 
|-id=832 bgcolor=#E9E9E9
| 571832 ||  || — || November 11, 2007 || Mount Lemmon || Mount Lemmon Survey ||  || align=right data-sort-value="0.74" | 740 m || 
|-id=833 bgcolor=#d6d6d6
| 571833 ||  || — || November 3, 2007 || Mount Lemmon || Mount Lemmon Survey ||  || align=right | 3.4 km || 
|-id=834 bgcolor=#d6d6d6
| 571834 ||  || — || November 9, 2007 || Catalina || CSS ||  || align=right | 3.6 km || 
|-id=835 bgcolor=#d6d6d6
| 571835 ||  || — || November 16, 2007 || Mount Lemmon || Mount Lemmon Survey ||  || align=right | 2.7 km || 
|-id=836 bgcolor=#E9E9E9
| 571836 ||  || — || November 18, 2007 || Mount Lemmon || Mount Lemmon Survey ||  || align=right | 2.1 km || 
|-id=837 bgcolor=#d6d6d6
| 571837 ||  || — || November 18, 2007 || Mount Lemmon || Mount Lemmon Survey ||  || align=right | 3.4 km || 
|-id=838 bgcolor=#fefefe
| 571838 ||  || — || December 4, 1996 || Kitt Peak || Spacewatch ||  || align=right data-sort-value="0.87" | 870 m || 
|-id=839 bgcolor=#fefefe
| 571839 ||  || — || October 1, 2003 || Kitt Peak || Spacewatch ||  || align=right data-sort-value="0.89" | 890 m || 
|-id=840 bgcolor=#fefefe
| 571840 ||  || — || November 19, 2007 || Kitt Peak || Spacewatch ||  || align=right data-sort-value="0.53" | 530 m || 
|-id=841 bgcolor=#fefefe
| 571841 ||  || — || November 19, 2007 || Mount Lemmon || Mount Lemmon Survey ||  || align=right data-sort-value="0.80" | 800 m || 
|-id=842 bgcolor=#fefefe
| 571842 ||  || — || November 8, 2007 || Kitt Peak || Spacewatch ||  || align=right data-sort-value="0.54" | 540 m || 
|-id=843 bgcolor=#fefefe
| 571843 ||  || — || November 19, 2007 || Mount Lemmon || Mount Lemmon Survey ||  || align=right data-sort-value="0.63" | 630 m || 
|-id=844 bgcolor=#d6d6d6
| 571844 ||  || — || November 20, 2007 || Mount Lemmon || Mount Lemmon Survey ||  || align=right | 2.8 km || 
|-id=845 bgcolor=#d6d6d6
| 571845 ||  || — || November 20, 2007 || Mount Lemmon || Mount Lemmon Survey ||  || align=right | 2.3 km || 
|-id=846 bgcolor=#d6d6d6
| 571846 ||  || — || November 20, 2007 || Mount Lemmon || Mount Lemmon Survey ||  || align=right | 2.5 km || 
|-id=847 bgcolor=#d6d6d6
| 571847 ||  || — || November 4, 2007 || Kitt Peak || Spacewatch ||  || align=right | 2.0 km || 
|-id=848 bgcolor=#d6d6d6
| 571848 ||  || — || November 30, 2007 || Vallemare Borbona || V. S. Casulli ||  || align=right | 2.4 km || 
|-id=849 bgcolor=#d6d6d6
| 571849 ||  || — || November 18, 2007 || Kitt Peak || Spacewatch ||  || align=right | 1.9 km || 
|-id=850 bgcolor=#d6d6d6
| 571850 ||  || — || November 2, 2007 || Kitt Peak || Spacewatch ||  || align=right | 3.1 km || 
|-id=851 bgcolor=#d6d6d6
| 571851 ||  || — || January 31, 2009 || Kitt Peak || Spacewatch ||  || align=right | 2.1 km || 
|-id=852 bgcolor=#d6d6d6
| 571852 ||  || — || November 17, 2007 || Kitt Peak || Spacewatch ||  || align=right | 2.8 km || 
|-id=853 bgcolor=#d6d6d6
| 571853 ||  || — || November 17, 2007 || Mount Lemmon || Mount Lemmon Survey ||  || align=right | 2.7 km || 
|-id=854 bgcolor=#fefefe
| 571854 ||  || — || September 13, 2014 || Haleakala || Pan-STARRS ||  || align=right data-sort-value="0.77" | 770 m || 
|-id=855 bgcolor=#d6d6d6
| 571855 ||  || — || July 4, 2016 || Haleakala || Pan-STARRS ||  || align=right | 1.9 km || 
|-id=856 bgcolor=#d6d6d6
| 571856 ||  || — || April 23, 2015 || Haleakala || Pan-STARRS ||  || align=right | 2.2 km || 
|-id=857 bgcolor=#d6d6d6
| 571857 ||  || — || October 25, 2012 || Mount Lemmon || Mount Lemmon Survey ||  || align=right | 2.5 km || 
|-id=858 bgcolor=#d6d6d6
| 571858 ||  || — || November 17, 2007 || Kitt Peak || Spacewatch ||  || align=right | 2.0 km || 
|-id=859 bgcolor=#fefefe
| 571859 ||  || — || November 18, 2007 || Kitt Peak || Spacewatch ||  || align=right data-sort-value="0.76" | 760 m || 
|-id=860 bgcolor=#d6d6d6
| 571860 ||  || — || November 16, 2007 || Mount Lemmon || Mount Lemmon Survey ||  || align=right | 2.1 km || 
|-id=861 bgcolor=#fefefe
| 571861 ||  || — || December 4, 2007 || Kitt Peak || Spacewatch ||  || align=right data-sort-value="0.74" | 740 m || 
|-id=862 bgcolor=#d6d6d6
| 571862 ||  || — || May 23, 2006 || Mount Lemmon || Mount Lemmon Survey ||  || align=right | 2.7 km || 
|-id=863 bgcolor=#fefefe
| 571863 ||  || — || July 8, 2003 || Palomar || NEAT || ERI || align=right | 1.6 km || 
|-id=864 bgcolor=#d6d6d6
| 571864 ||  || — || December 14, 2007 || Kitt Peak || Spacewatch ||  || align=right | 2.3 km || 
|-id=865 bgcolor=#d6d6d6
| 571865 ||  || — || November 17, 2007 || Mount Lemmon || Mount Lemmon Survey ||  || align=right | 3.1 km || 
|-id=866 bgcolor=#fefefe
| 571866 ||  || — || November 20, 2007 || Mount Lemmon || Mount Lemmon Survey ||  || align=right data-sort-value="0.79" | 790 m || 
|-id=867 bgcolor=#fefefe
| 571867 ||  || — || December 13, 2007 || Socorro || LINEAR ||  || align=right | 1.2 km || 
|-id=868 bgcolor=#fefefe
| 571868 ||  || — || December 15, 2007 || Kitt Peak || Spacewatch ||  || align=right data-sort-value="0.97" | 970 m || 
|-id=869 bgcolor=#d6d6d6
| 571869 ||  || — || November 5, 2007 || Kitt Peak || Spacewatch ||  || align=right | 3.9 km || 
|-id=870 bgcolor=#fefefe
| 571870 ||  || — || December 15, 2007 || Catalina || CSS ||  || align=right data-sort-value="0.73" | 730 m || 
|-id=871 bgcolor=#d6d6d6
| 571871 ||  || — || December 15, 2007 || Kitt Peak || Spacewatch ||  || align=right | 2.4 km || 
|-id=872 bgcolor=#d6d6d6
| 571872 ||  || — || December 4, 2007 || Kitt Peak || Spacewatch ||  || align=right | 2.7 km || 
|-id=873 bgcolor=#fefefe
| 571873 ||  || — || April 2, 2005 || Kitt Peak || Spacewatch ||  || align=right data-sort-value="0.73" | 730 m || 
|-id=874 bgcolor=#fefefe
| 571874 ||  || — || December 6, 2007 || Kitt Peak || Spacewatch ||  || align=right data-sort-value="0.74" | 740 m || 
|-id=875 bgcolor=#fefefe
| 571875 ||  || — || December 6, 2007 || Charleston || R. Holmes ||  || align=right data-sort-value="0.82" | 820 m || 
|-id=876 bgcolor=#d6d6d6
| 571876 ||  || — || December 4, 2007 || Kitt Peak || Spacewatch ||  || align=right | 2.2 km || 
|-id=877 bgcolor=#d6d6d6
| 571877 ||  || — || February 10, 2014 || Haleakala || Pan-STARRS ||  || align=right | 2.1 km || 
|-id=878 bgcolor=#E9E9E9
| 571878 ||  || — || October 10, 2015 || Haleakala || Pan-STARRS ||  || align=right | 1.8 km || 
|-id=879 bgcolor=#d6d6d6
| 571879 ||  || — || June 12, 2015 || Haleakala || Pan-STARRS ||  || align=right | 2.5 km || 
|-id=880 bgcolor=#d6d6d6
| 571880 ||  || — || December 5, 2007 || Kitt Peak || Spacewatch ||  || align=right | 2.7 km || 
|-id=881 bgcolor=#d6d6d6
| 571881 ||  || — || August 28, 2017 || Bergisch Gladbach || W. Bickel ||  || align=right | 3.1 km || 
|-id=882 bgcolor=#d6d6d6
| 571882 ||  || — || December 4, 2007 || Kitt Peak || Spacewatch ||  || align=right | 3.2 km || 
|-id=883 bgcolor=#d6d6d6
| 571883 ||  || — || December 15, 2007 || Mount Lemmon || Mount Lemmon Survey ||  || align=right | 2.6 km || 
|-id=884 bgcolor=#d6d6d6
| 571884 ||  || — || August 31, 2017 || Mount Lemmon || Mount Lemmon Survey ||  || align=right | 2.7 km || 
|-id=885 bgcolor=#d6d6d6
| 571885 ||  || — || December 5, 2007 || Kitt Peak || Spacewatch ||  || align=right | 2.1 km || 
|-id=886 bgcolor=#d6d6d6
| 571886 ||  || — || December 14, 2007 || Mount Lemmon || Mount Lemmon Survey ||  || align=right | 2.3 km || 
|-id=887 bgcolor=#d6d6d6
| 571887 ||  || — || December 4, 2007 || Mount Lemmon || Mount Lemmon Survey ||  || align=right | 1.9 km || 
|-id=888 bgcolor=#d6d6d6
| 571888 ||  || — || December 16, 2007 || Bergisch Gladbach || W. Bickel ||  || align=right | 3.4 km || 
|-id=889 bgcolor=#d6d6d6
| 571889 ||  || — || December 16, 2007 || Bergisch Gladbach || W. Bickel ||  || align=right | 2.5 km || 
|-id=890 bgcolor=#fefefe
| 571890 ||  || — || December 19, 2007 || Piszkesteto || K. Sárneczky ||  || align=right | 1.00 km || 
|-id=891 bgcolor=#d6d6d6
| 571891 ||  || — || December 16, 2007 || Mount Lemmon || Mount Lemmon Survey ||  || align=right | 2.8 km || 
|-id=892 bgcolor=#fefefe
| 571892 ||  || — || September 30, 2003 || Kitt Peak || Spacewatch ||  || align=right data-sort-value="0.73" | 730 m || 
|-id=893 bgcolor=#d6d6d6
| 571893 ||  || — || December 16, 2007 || Mount Lemmon || Mount Lemmon Survey ||  || align=right | 2.5 km || 
|-id=894 bgcolor=#d6d6d6
| 571894 ||  || — || December 17, 2007 || Mount Lemmon || Mount Lemmon Survey ||  || align=right | 2.3 km || 
|-id=895 bgcolor=#d6d6d6
| 571895 ||  || — || December 17, 2007 || Mount Lemmon || Mount Lemmon Survey ||  || align=right | 2.6 km || 
|-id=896 bgcolor=#d6d6d6
| 571896 ||  || — || December 5, 2007 || Kitt Peak || Spacewatch ||  || align=right | 2.3 km || 
|-id=897 bgcolor=#d6d6d6
| 571897 ||  || — || December 16, 2007 || Kitt Peak || Spacewatch ||  || align=right | 2.2 km || 
|-id=898 bgcolor=#fefefe
| 571898 ||  || — || December 16, 2007 || Mount Lemmon || Mount Lemmon Survey ||  || align=right data-sort-value="0.67" | 670 m || 
|-id=899 bgcolor=#d6d6d6
| 571899 ||  || — || December 16, 2007 || Mount Lemmon || Mount Lemmon Survey ||  || align=right | 3.4 km || 
|-id=900 bgcolor=#E9E9E9
| 571900 ||  || — || August 29, 2006 || Kitt Peak || Spacewatch ||  || align=right | 2.0 km || 
|}

571901–572000 

|-bgcolor=#fefefe
| 571901 ||  || — || December 28, 2007 || Kitt Peak || Spacewatch || H || align=right data-sort-value="0.56" | 560 m || 
|-id=902 bgcolor=#fefefe
| 571902 ||  || — || December 28, 2007 || Kitt Peak || Spacewatch ||  || align=right data-sort-value="0.99" | 990 m || 
|-id=903 bgcolor=#d6d6d6
| 571903 ||  || — || December 17, 2007 || Kitt Peak || Spacewatch ||  || align=right | 2.5 km || 
|-id=904 bgcolor=#fefefe
| 571904 ||  || — || August 28, 2006 || Anderson Mesa || LONEOS ||  || align=right data-sort-value="0.91" | 910 m || 
|-id=905 bgcolor=#fefefe
| 571905 ||  || — || December 17, 2007 || Mount Lemmon || Mount Lemmon Survey ||  || align=right data-sort-value="0.57" | 570 m || 
|-id=906 bgcolor=#d6d6d6
| 571906 ||  || — || December 28, 2007 || Kitt Peak || Spacewatch ||  || align=right | 2.5 km || 
|-id=907 bgcolor=#d6d6d6
| 571907 ||  || — || December 30, 2007 || Mount Lemmon || Mount Lemmon Survey ||  || align=right | 2.7 km || 
|-id=908 bgcolor=#d6d6d6
| 571908 ||  || — || December 30, 2007 || Kitt Peak || Spacewatch ||  || align=right | 2.4 km || 
|-id=909 bgcolor=#d6d6d6
| 571909 ||  || — || September 28, 2006 || Kitt Peak || Spacewatch || 3:2 || align=right | 4.2 km || 
|-id=910 bgcolor=#d6d6d6
| 571910 ||  || — || December 19, 2007 || Mount Lemmon || Mount Lemmon Survey ||  || align=right | 2.7 km || 
|-id=911 bgcolor=#d6d6d6
| 571911 ||  || — || November 26, 2012 || Mount Lemmon || Mount Lemmon Survey ||  || align=right | 2.5 km || 
|-id=912 bgcolor=#d6d6d6
| 571912 ||  || — || December 31, 2007 || Kitt Peak || Spacewatch ||  || align=right | 2.5 km || 
|-id=913 bgcolor=#fefefe
| 571913 ||  || — || December 31, 2007 || Kitt Peak || Spacewatch ||  || align=right data-sort-value="0.68" | 680 m || 
|-id=914 bgcolor=#d6d6d6
| 571914 ||  || — || November 5, 2012 || Kitt Peak || Spacewatch ||  || align=right | 2.4 km || 
|-id=915 bgcolor=#d6d6d6
| 571915 ||  || — || December 30, 2007 || Kitt Peak || Spacewatch ||  || align=right | 2.2 km || 
|-id=916 bgcolor=#d6d6d6
| 571916 ||  || — || February 24, 2014 || Haleakala || Pan-STARRS ||  || align=right | 2.1 km || 
|-id=917 bgcolor=#fefefe
| 571917 ||  || — || December 9, 2015 || Haleakala || Pan-STARRS ||  || align=right data-sort-value="0.82" | 820 m || 
|-id=918 bgcolor=#d6d6d6
| 571918 ||  || — || April 4, 2014 || Mount Lemmon || Mount Lemmon Survey ||  || align=right | 2.2 km || 
|-id=919 bgcolor=#d6d6d6
| 571919 ||  || — || December 31, 2013 || Haleakala || Pan-STARRS ||  || align=right | 2.9 km || 
|-id=920 bgcolor=#fefefe
| 571920 ||  || — || March 29, 2017 || Haleakala || Pan-STARRS ||  || align=right data-sort-value="0.77" | 770 m || 
|-id=921 bgcolor=#d6d6d6
| 571921 ||  || — || November 13, 2007 || Mount Lemmon || Mount Lemmon Survey ||  || align=right | 2.3 km || 
|-id=922 bgcolor=#d6d6d6
| 571922 ||  || — || May 23, 2015 || Cerro Tololo-DECam || CTIO-DECam ||  || align=right | 2.2 km || 
|-id=923 bgcolor=#d6d6d6
| 571923 ||  || — || March 18, 2009 || Kitt Peak || Spacewatch ||  || align=right | 2.0 km || 
|-id=924 bgcolor=#d6d6d6
| 571924 ||  || — || August 26, 2016 || Haleakala || Pan-STARRS ||  || align=right | 2.1 km || 
|-id=925 bgcolor=#E9E9E9
| 571925 ||  || — || November 3, 2011 || Mount Lemmon || Mount Lemmon Survey ||  || align=right data-sort-value="0.68" | 680 m || 
|-id=926 bgcolor=#d6d6d6
| 571926 ||  || — || December 18, 2007 || Mount Lemmon || Mount Lemmon Survey ||  || align=right | 2.3 km || 
|-id=927 bgcolor=#d6d6d6
| 571927 ||  || — || July 4, 2016 || Haleakala || Pan-STARRS ||  || align=right | 2.2 km || 
|-id=928 bgcolor=#fefefe
| 571928 ||  || — || January 26, 2012 || Mount Lemmon || Mount Lemmon Survey ||  || align=right data-sort-value="0.64" | 640 m || 
|-id=929 bgcolor=#d6d6d6
| 571929 ||  || — || March 23, 2003 || Apache Point || SDSS Collaboration ||  || align=right | 2.3 km || 
|-id=930 bgcolor=#d6d6d6
| 571930 ||  || — || December 18, 2007 || Kitt Peak || Spacewatch ||  || align=right | 2.7 km || 
|-id=931 bgcolor=#d6d6d6
| 571931 ||  || — || December 19, 2007 || Mount Lemmon || Mount Lemmon Survey ||  || align=right | 2.8 km || 
|-id=932 bgcolor=#d6d6d6
| 571932 ||  || — || December 30, 2007 || Kitt Peak || Spacewatch ||  || align=right | 2.4 km || 
|-id=933 bgcolor=#d6d6d6
| 571933 ||  || — || December 16, 2007 || Mount Lemmon || Mount Lemmon Survey ||  || align=right | 2.6 km || 
|-id=934 bgcolor=#d6d6d6
| 571934 ||  || — || December 17, 2007 || Kitt Peak || Spacewatch ||  || align=right | 2.4 km || 
|-id=935 bgcolor=#d6d6d6
| 571935 ||  || — || December 17, 2007 || Kitt Peak || Spacewatch ||  || align=right | 2.5 km || 
|-id=936 bgcolor=#E9E9E9
| 571936 ||  || — || December 31, 2007 || Kitt Peak || Spacewatch ||  || align=right | 1.2 km || 
|-id=937 bgcolor=#d6d6d6
| 571937 ||  || — || January 1, 2008 || Costitx || OAM Obs. ||  || align=right | 3.4 km || 
|-id=938 bgcolor=#d6d6d6
| 571938 ||  || — || January 6, 2008 || Zelenchukskaya Stn || Zelenchukskaya Stn. ||  || align=right | 3.5 km || 
|-id=939 bgcolor=#d6d6d6
| 571939 ||  || — || January 10, 2008 || Kitt Peak || Spacewatch ||  || align=right | 2.5 km || 
|-id=940 bgcolor=#fefefe
| 571940 ||  || — || January 10, 2008 || Mount Lemmon || Mount Lemmon Survey ||  || align=right data-sort-value="0.78" | 780 m || 
|-id=941 bgcolor=#E9E9E9
| 571941 ||  || — || December 30, 2007 || Mount Lemmon || Mount Lemmon Survey ||  || align=right | 1.3 km || 
|-id=942 bgcolor=#d6d6d6
| 571942 ||  || — || January 10, 2008 || Mount Lemmon || Mount Lemmon Survey ||  || align=right | 2.4 km || 
|-id=943 bgcolor=#d6d6d6
| 571943 ||  || — || July 29, 2000 || Cerro Tololo || M. W. Buie, S. D. Kern ||  || align=right | 3.2 km || 
|-id=944 bgcolor=#d6d6d6
| 571944 ||  || — || January 10, 2008 || Mount Lemmon || Mount Lemmon Survey ||  || align=right | 2.6 km || 
|-id=945 bgcolor=#d6d6d6
| 571945 ||  || — || March 23, 2003 || Apache Point || SDSS Collaboration ||  || align=right | 2.1 km || 
|-id=946 bgcolor=#d6d6d6
| 571946 ||  || — || January 10, 2008 || Mount Lemmon || Mount Lemmon Survey ||  || align=right | 2.7 km || 
|-id=947 bgcolor=#d6d6d6
| 571947 ||  || — || January 10, 2008 || Mount Lemmon || Mount Lemmon Survey ||  || align=right | 3.9 km || 
|-id=948 bgcolor=#d6d6d6
| 571948 ||  || — || November 19, 2007 || Kitt Peak || Spacewatch ||  || align=right | 2.6 km || 
|-id=949 bgcolor=#d6d6d6
| 571949 ||  || — || December 16, 2007 || Kitt Peak || Spacewatch ||  || align=right | 2.0 km || 
|-id=950 bgcolor=#d6d6d6
| 571950 ||  || — || December 31, 2007 || Kitt Peak || Spacewatch ||  || align=right | 2.7 km || 
|-id=951 bgcolor=#d6d6d6
| 571951 ||  || — || January 1, 2008 || Kitt Peak || Spacewatch ||  || align=right | 2.7 km || 
|-id=952 bgcolor=#d6d6d6
| 571952 ||  || — || September 16, 2006 || Anderson Mesa || LONEOS ||  || align=right | 2.3 km || 
|-id=953 bgcolor=#fefefe
| 571953 ||  || — || November 20, 2003 || Needville || P. Garossino, D. Wells ||  || align=right data-sort-value="0.86" | 860 m || 
|-id=954 bgcolor=#d6d6d6
| 571954 ||  || — || January 11, 2008 || Kitt Peak || Spacewatch ||  || align=right | 2.8 km || 
|-id=955 bgcolor=#d6d6d6
| 571955 ||  || — || March 24, 2003 || Kitt Peak || Spacewatch ||  || align=right | 2.6 km || 
|-id=956 bgcolor=#d6d6d6
| 571956 ||  || — || January 11, 2008 || Kitt Peak || Spacewatch ||  || align=right | 2.1 km || 
|-id=957 bgcolor=#d6d6d6
| 571957 ||  || — || December 30, 2007 || Mount Lemmon || Mount Lemmon Survey ||  || align=right | 3.2 km || 
|-id=958 bgcolor=#fefefe
| 571958 ||  || — || November 20, 2007 || Kitt Peak || Spacewatch ||  || align=right data-sort-value="0.72" | 720 m || 
|-id=959 bgcolor=#d6d6d6
| 571959 ||  || — || January 10, 2008 || Kitt Peak || Spacewatch ||  || align=right | 2.0 km || 
|-id=960 bgcolor=#d6d6d6
| 571960 ||  || — || December 31, 2007 || Kitt Peak || Spacewatch ||  || align=right | 2.7 km || 
|-id=961 bgcolor=#d6d6d6
| 571961 ||  || — || December 14, 2007 || Mount Lemmon || Mount Lemmon Survey ||  || align=right | 2.7 km || 
|-id=962 bgcolor=#d6d6d6
| 571962 ||  || — || January 28, 2003 || Kitt Peak || Spacewatch ||  || align=right | 2.7 km || 
|-id=963 bgcolor=#d6d6d6
| 571963 ||  || — || November 4, 2007 || Mount Lemmon || Mount Lemmon Survey ||  || align=right | 2.2 km || 
|-id=964 bgcolor=#d6d6d6
| 571964 ||  || — || December 18, 2007 || Kitt Peak || Spacewatch ||  || align=right | 2.3 km || 
|-id=965 bgcolor=#fefefe
| 571965 ||  || — || January 15, 2008 || Kitt Peak || Spacewatch ||  || align=right data-sort-value="0.75" | 750 m || 
|-id=966 bgcolor=#d6d6d6
| 571966 ||  || — || December 20, 2007 || Kitt Peak || Spacewatch ||  || align=right | 2.7 km || 
|-id=967 bgcolor=#d6d6d6
| 571967 ||  || — || January 13, 2008 || Kitt Peak || Spacewatch ||  || align=right | 2.6 km || 
|-id=968 bgcolor=#d6d6d6
| 571968 ||  || — || December 30, 2007 || Kitt Peak || Spacewatch ||  || align=right | 2.7 km || 
|-id=969 bgcolor=#d6d6d6
| 571969 ||  || — || January 13, 2008 || Kitt Peak || Spacewatch ||  || align=right | 2.1 km || 
|-id=970 bgcolor=#d6d6d6
| 571970 ||  || — || December 30, 2007 || Kitt Peak || Spacewatch ||  || align=right | 2.2 km || 
|-id=971 bgcolor=#d6d6d6
| 571971 ||  || — || December 14, 2007 || Mount Lemmon || Mount Lemmon Survey ||  || align=right | 3.4 km || 
|-id=972 bgcolor=#d6d6d6
| 571972 ||  || — || January 14, 2008 || Kitt Peak || Spacewatch ||  || align=right | 3.1 km || 
|-id=973 bgcolor=#d6d6d6
| 571973 ||  || — || January 14, 2008 || Kitt Peak || Spacewatch ||  || align=right | 2.5 km || 
|-id=974 bgcolor=#d6d6d6
| 571974 ||  || — || January 14, 2008 || Kitt Peak || Spacewatch ||  || align=right | 2.5 km || 
|-id=975 bgcolor=#d6d6d6
| 571975 ||  || — || January 14, 2008 || Kitt Peak || Spacewatch ||  || align=right | 2.6 km || 
|-id=976 bgcolor=#d6d6d6
| 571976 ||  || — || January 10, 2008 || Kitt Peak || Spacewatch ||  || align=right | 2.3 km || 
|-id=977 bgcolor=#E9E9E9
| 571977 ||  || — || January 6, 2008 || Mauna Kea || Mauna Kea Obs. ||  || align=right | 1.8 km || 
|-id=978 bgcolor=#d6d6d6
| 571978 ||  || — || January 12, 2008 || Mount Lemmon || Mount Lemmon Survey ||  || align=right | 1.9 km || 
|-id=979 bgcolor=#d6d6d6
| 571979 ||  || — || July 6, 2005 || Kitt Peak || Spacewatch ||  || align=right | 2.0 km || 
|-id=980 bgcolor=#d6d6d6
| 571980 ||  || — || January 13, 2008 || Kitt Peak || Spacewatch ||  || align=right | 3.4 km || 
|-id=981 bgcolor=#fefefe
| 571981 ||  || — || January 11, 2008 || Mount Lemmon || Mount Lemmon Survey ||  || align=right data-sort-value="0.77" | 770 m || 
|-id=982 bgcolor=#E9E9E9
| 571982 ||  || — || December 30, 2007 || Kitt Peak || Spacewatch ||  || align=right | 1.3 km || 
|-id=983 bgcolor=#fefefe
| 571983 ||  || — || March 17, 2012 || Mount Lemmon || Mount Lemmon Survey ||  || align=right data-sort-value="0.71" | 710 m || 
|-id=984 bgcolor=#d6d6d6
| 571984 ||  || — || October 6, 2012 || Kitt Peak || Spacewatch ||  || align=right | 2.2 km || 
|-id=985 bgcolor=#d6d6d6
| 571985 ||  || — || July 28, 2011 || Haleakala || Pan-STARRS ||  || align=right | 2.8 km || 
|-id=986 bgcolor=#d6d6d6
| 571986 ||  || — || March 26, 2009 || Kitt Peak || Spacewatch ||  || align=right | 2.4 km || 
|-id=987 bgcolor=#fefefe
| 571987 ||  || — || January 11, 2008 || Kitt Peak || Spacewatch ||  || align=right data-sort-value="0.77" | 770 m || 
|-id=988 bgcolor=#d6d6d6
| 571988 ||  || — || January 13, 2008 || Mount Lemmon || Mount Lemmon Survey ||  || align=right | 2.7 km || 
|-id=989 bgcolor=#d6d6d6
| 571989 ||  || — || August 28, 2016 || Mount Lemmon || Mount Lemmon Survey ||  || align=right | 2.0 km || 
|-id=990 bgcolor=#d6d6d6
| 571990 ||  || — || May 14, 2015 || Haleakala || Pan-STARRS ||  || align=right | 2.2 km || 
|-id=991 bgcolor=#d6d6d6
| 571991 ||  || — || August 2, 2011 || Haleakala || Pan-STARRS ||  || align=right | 3.4 km || 
|-id=992 bgcolor=#d6d6d6
| 571992 ||  || — || January 30, 2009 || Mount Lemmon || Mount Lemmon Survey ||  || align=right | 2.9 km || 
|-id=993 bgcolor=#d6d6d6
| 571993 ||  || — || December 16, 2007 || Mount Lemmon || Mount Lemmon Survey ||  || align=right | 2.3 km || 
|-id=994 bgcolor=#d6d6d6
| 571994 ||  || — || January 11, 2008 || Mount Lemmon || Mount Lemmon Survey ||  || align=right | 2.9 km || 
|-id=995 bgcolor=#d6d6d6
| 571995 ||  || — || April 20, 2014 || Mount Lemmon || Mount Lemmon Survey ||  || align=right | 1.8 km || 
|-id=996 bgcolor=#d6d6d6
| 571996 ||  || — || January 13, 2008 || Mount Lemmon || Mount Lemmon Survey ||  || align=right | 2.2 km || 
|-id=997 bgcolor=#d6d6d6
| 571997 ||  || — || December 18, 2007 || Mount Lemmon || Mount Lemmon Survey ||  || align=right | 2.3 km || 
|-id=998 bgcolor=#d6d6d6
| 571998 ||  || — || January 14, 2008 || Kitt Peak || Spacewatch ||  || align=right | 2.7 km || 
|-id=999 bgcolor=#d6d6d6
| 571999 ||  || — || November 12, 2012 || Haleakala || Pan-STARRS ||  || align=right | 2.0 km || 
|-id=000 bgcolor=#d6d6d6
| 572000 ||  || — || November 18, 2017 || Haleakala || Pan-STARRS ||  || align=right | 2.1 km || 
|}

References

External links 
 Discovery Circumstances: Numbered Minor Planets (570001)–(575000) (IAU Minor Planet Center)

0571